= Ballynoe, Great Island =

Suburb of Cobh, County Cork, Ireland

Ballynoe An Baile Nua
- Townland
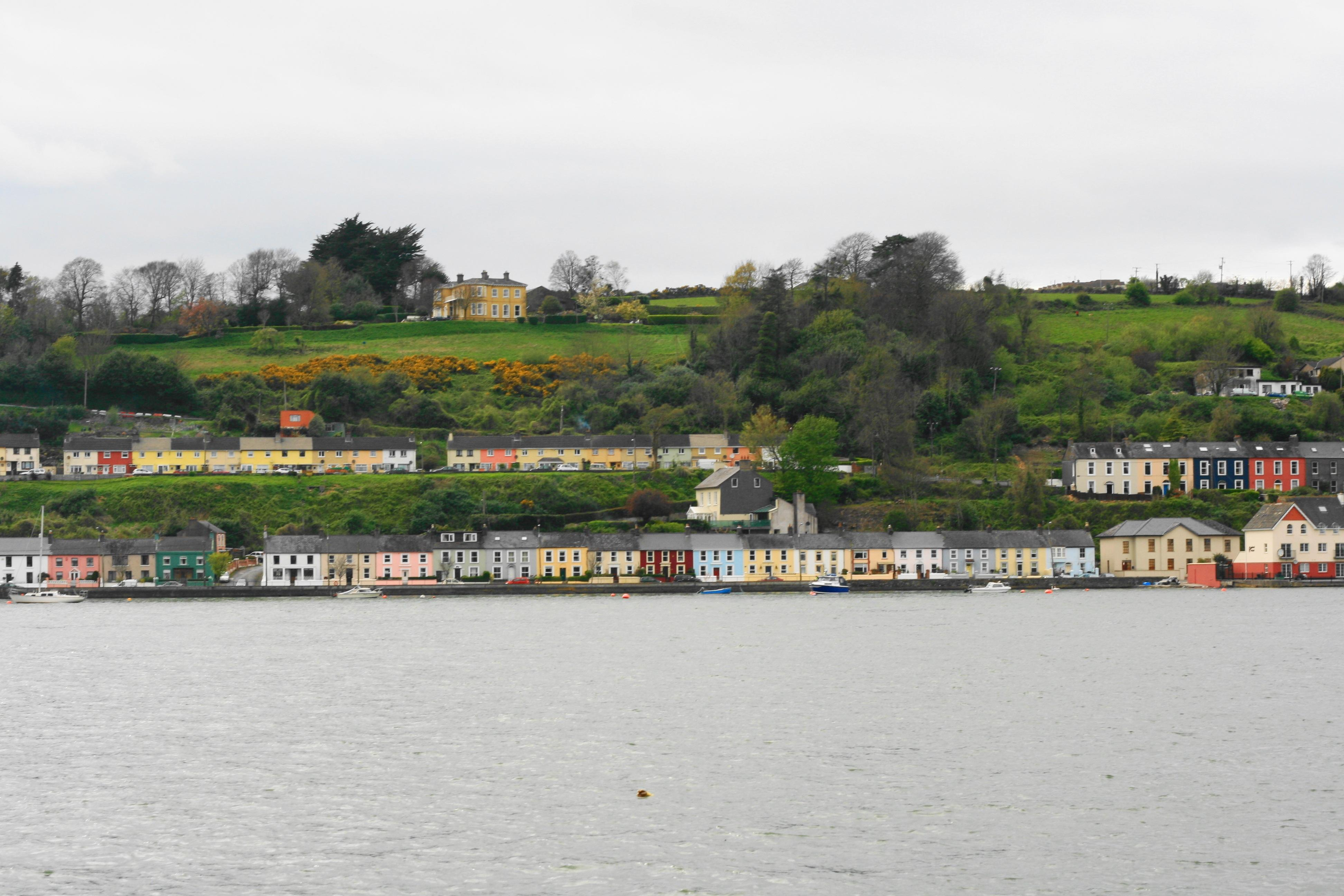
- Ballynoe and River Lee

- Location in Ireland
- Coordinates: 51°51′29″N 08°19′19″W
- Country: Ireland
- Province: Munster
- County: County Cork
- Time zone: UTC+0 (WET)
  - Summer (DST): UTC-1 (IST (WEST))

Ballynoe (Irish: An Baile Nua) is a townland and suburb of Cobh on Great Island in County Cork. It was extensively developed in the Celtic Tiger era.

== Transport ==
Ballynoe is north of Rushbrooke on the R624 road which runs alongside the channel connecting Lough Mahon to lower Cork Harbour and separating Great Island from Monkstown on the mainland. The cross-river car ferry from Monkstown docks on the R624 just north of Ballynoe.

A railway station at Ballynoe on the Cork–Cobh railway line was proposed in 1993 and included in the 1998 Cobh Action Area Plan and the 20-year strategy plan published in 2001, but considered unfeasible in 2002. It was in the 2009 county development plan, but postponed in 2010 because of Ireland's financial crisis. In 2019, the "Cork Metropolitan Area Draft Transport Strategy 2040", a public consultation document published by the National Transport Authority, included Ballynoe among six proposed suburban stations. Rushbrooke halt and Carrigaloe railway station are otherwise the nearest suburban rail stops.
