= R624 road (Ireland) =

Road in Ireland

R624 road
- Bóthar R624
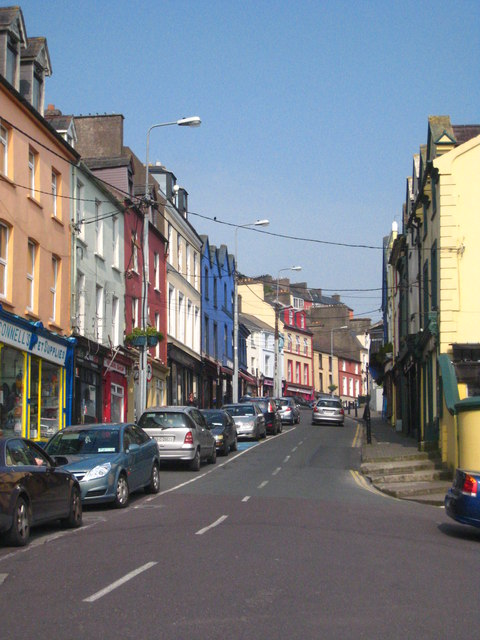
- East Beach, Cobh, on the R624

Route information
- Length: 9.5 km (5.9 mi)

Location
- Country: Ireland
- Primary destinations: County Cork; Tullagreen - leaves the N25 (Starts on the southside of the N25 Carrigtwohill-Cobh Interchange (0.0 km); Fota Island Resort & Spa (0.7 km); Fota Wildlife Park (1.5 km); Marian Terrace (3.2 km); Carrigaloe railway station (6.5 km); Rushbrooke railway station (8.4 km); High Road (Cobh railway station) Cobh Town Center (9.5 km)

Highway system
- Roads in Ireland; Motorways; Primary; Secondary; Regional

The R624 road is a regional road in Ireland which runs from the south-east of the N25 in Tullagreen, County Cork to Cobh town centre. It runs to several of County Cork's tourist attractions, including Fota Wildlife Park.

An upgrade had been proposed for the R624, originally planned to begin in 2010. This upgrade expected a new section to the road, to replace the existing road from Tullagreen N25 Carrigtwohill-Cobh Interchange to Belvelly. As of late 2015, no funding for development works on the R624 had been confirmed. However in late 2015 and early 2016, a number of calls were made for funding to be allocated, in particular to fund works on the road's main bridges.

The road is 9.5 km (5.9 mi) long.

== See also ==
- Roads in Ireland
- National primary road
- National secondary road
