= Belvelly Castle =

Tower house in County Cork, Ireland

Coordinates: 51.8881°N 8.3024°W

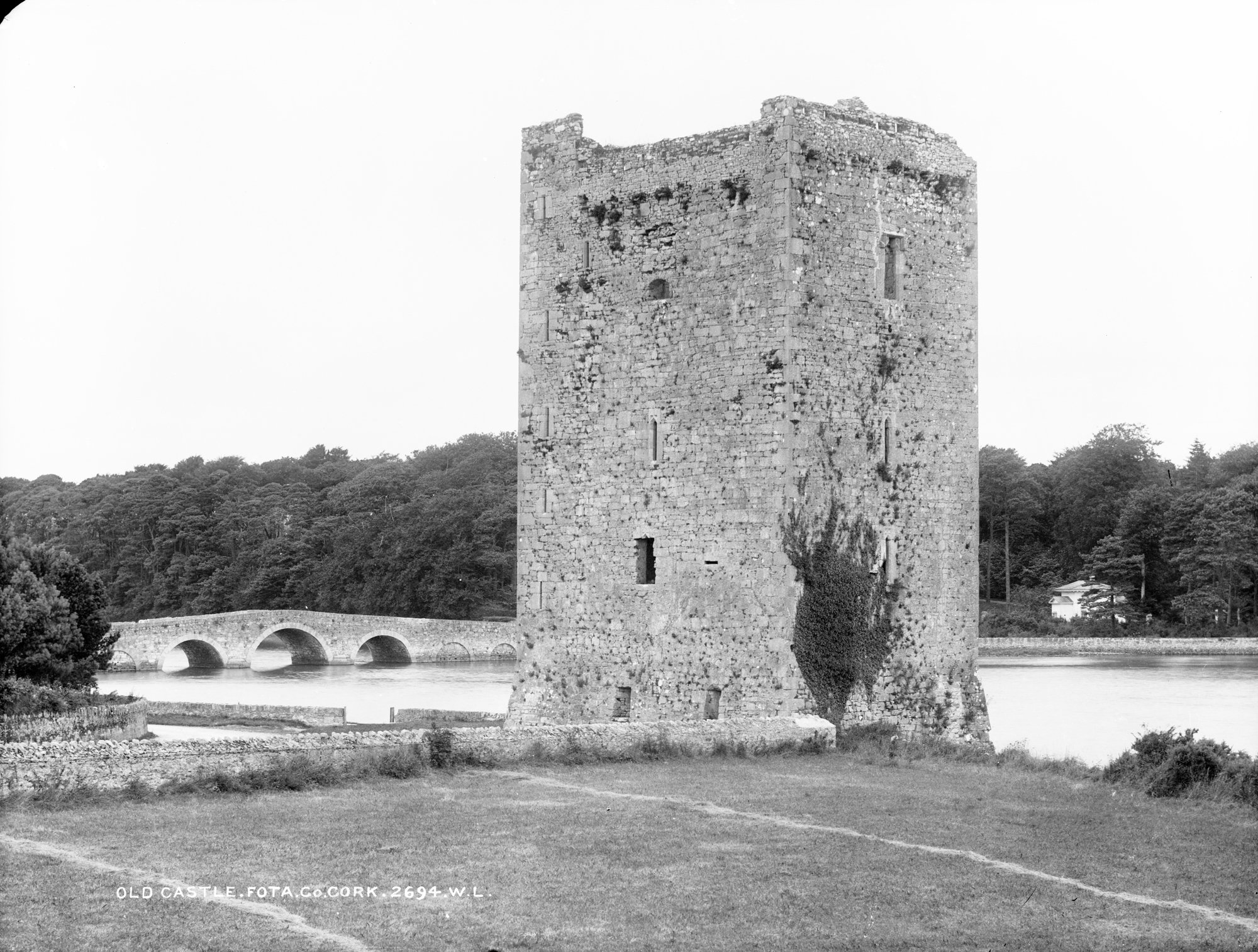
Belvelly Castle (14th or 15th century) and with Belvelly Bridge (built 1803) in the background

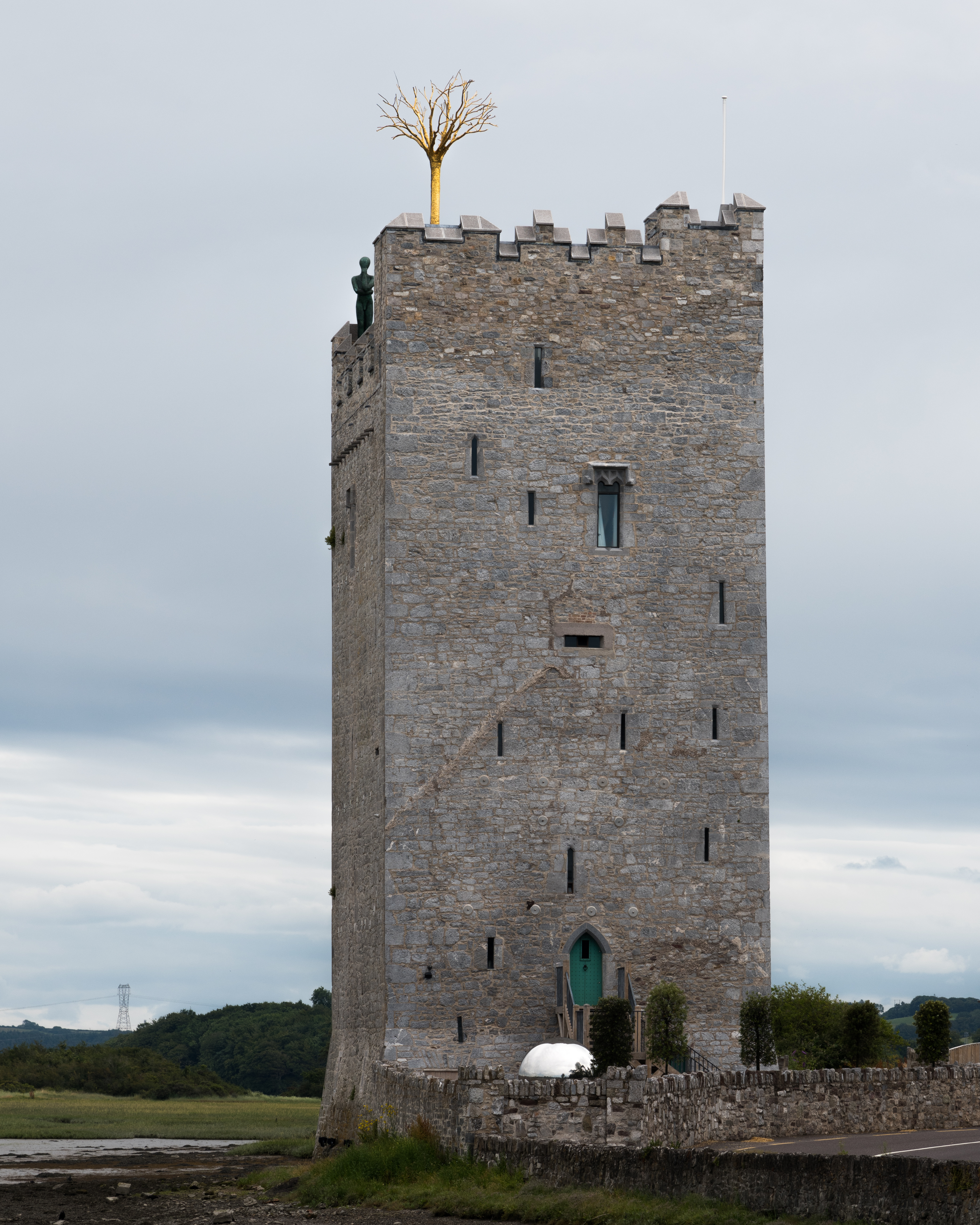
Belvelly Castle, following restoration, in 2021

Belvelly Castle is a 14th or 15th-century tower house in County Cork, Ireland. It is situated next to the small village of Belvelly, opposite and overlooking the only road bridge connecting Fota Island to Great Island (on which the town of Cobh is situated).

The castle was originally built by and for the Anglo-Norman Hodnett family, but was taken by the De la Roch (Roche) and De Barra (Barry) families in the 14th century. The Hodnetts later however leased-back their lands. Some sources suggest that Walter Raleigh occupied the castle in the 16th century, before being reoccupied by the De Barra family, and used by Roger Boyle, 1st Earl of Orrery to garrison troops during the Irish Confederate Wars in the mid-17th century.

By the 19th century the castle had fallen into ruin. During World War I, the castle received an increase in visitors when local coachmen brought sailors docked at nearby Queenstown (Cobh) to the castle - reputedly under the impression that they were actually visiting Blarney Castle and its Blarney Stone. The castle was occupied and somewhat modified by the Irish Army during the Emergency (1939-1945).

The castle was sold in the early 21st century, with planning permission granted in early 2016 for restoration for use as a private dwelling. This redevelopment was completed in late 2018, with additional artworks positioned on the roof of the tower house. The castle's owners are among the sponsors of local football club Cobh Ramblers FC.

== See also ==
- List of castles in Ireland
