= Arch Building, Cobh =

Municipal building in Cobh, County Cork, Ireland

Arch Building
- Foirgneamh Áirse
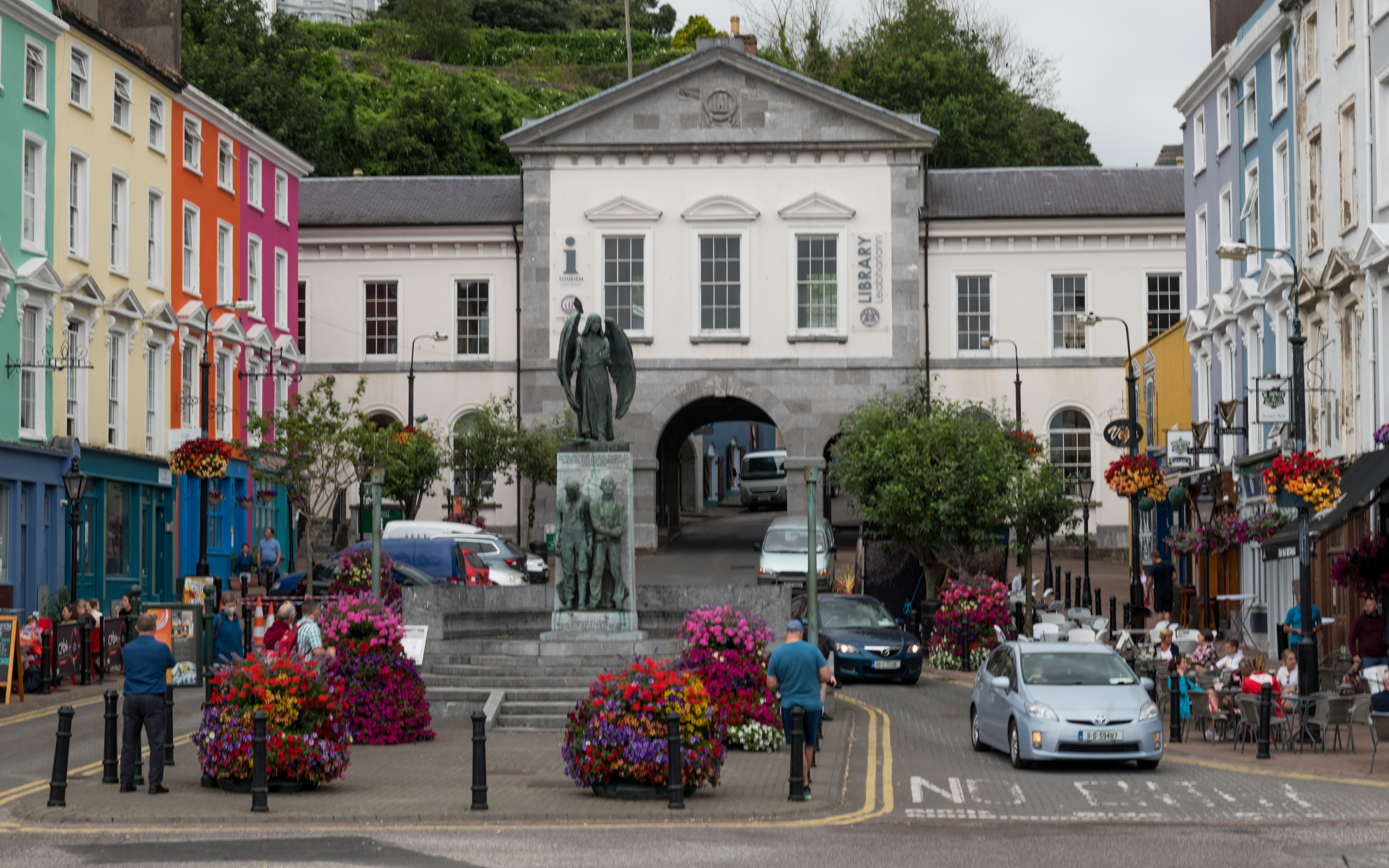
- Arch Building

- Location within County Cork

General information
- Architectural style: Neoclassical style
- Location: Casement Square, Cobh, Ireland
- Coordinates: 51.8507°N 8.2953°W
- Completed: 1806

Design and construction
- Architect: Alexander Deane

The Arch Building (Irish: Foirgneamh Áirse), previously known as Cobh Town Hall and before that as Queenstown Town Hall (Irish: Halla an Bhaile An Cóbh), is a municipal building in Casement Square, Cobh, County Cork, Ireland. The building currently accommodates a public library and a tourist information centre. It is included in Cork County Council's Record of Protected Structures.

== History ==
The building was commissioned as a market house by John Smith-Barry (1793–1837), whose seat was at Fota House, and was completed in 1806. It was then remodelled and enlarged in the mid-19th century, as part of a larger scheme commissioned by his son, James Hugh Smith-Barry (1716–1856), to create a new square, known as Scotts Square. The enlarged building was designed by Alexander Deane in the neoclassical style, built in brick with a cement render finish and with grey limestone dressings, and was officially opened on 27 May 1852.

The design involved a symmetrical main frontage of thirteen bays facing onto the new square. The central section of three bays, which was slightly projected forward and faced in grey limestone on the ground floor, featured a carriageway arch flanked by two smaller pedestrian arches, all with voussoirs and keystones. On the first floor, there was a central sash window with a segmental headed pediment, flanked by two sash windows with triangular pediments, all with window sills. The central section was surmounted by a modillioned cornice and by a pediment with a coat of arms in the tympanum. The wings of five bays each were fenestrated by round headed windows with architraves on the ground floor, and by sash windows with architraves on the first floor, and were surmounted by modillioned cornices.

After the Cunard passenger liner RMS Lusitania was sunk by a German U-boat off the Old Head of Kinsale, while en route from the US to Liverpool on 7 May 1915, local fishermen collected the bodies of the victims from the beach and laid them out in the assembly hall. Scotts Square was renamed Casement Square in memory of the Irish nationalist, Roger Casement, when Queenstown was renamed Cobh in 1920. A statue, intended to commemorate the victims of the Lusitania disaster, was sculpted by Jerome Connor in the form of an Angel of Peace standing above two fishermen and was unveiled in front of the building in Casement Square in 1968.

In 1976, the building was converted for use as a public library at a cost of £75,000. The building also became the home of the local tourist information centre, and the District Court also occupied part of the building until it closed in 2010. A significant programme of repair works, to restore the main frontage of the building, was undertaken in 2012.

== See also ==
- Old Town Hall, Cobh
