= James Roche Verling =

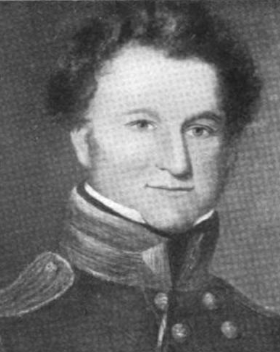
- Born: 27 February 1787; The Cove of Cork (now Cobh), County Cork, Kingdom of Ireland
- Died: 1 January 1858 (aged 70); Ballyvaloon, Queenstown (now Cobh), County Cork, Ireland, then part of the United Kingdom
- Education: University of Edinburgh
- Occupation: Surgeon

James Roche Verling (27 February 1787 – 1 January 1858) was a British Army surgeon who became personal surgeon to Napoleon Bonaparte on St Helena.

== Life ==
Verling was born into an Irish Catholic family in the Cove of Cork (later renamed in 1849 as Queenstown and known since 1923 as Cobh), a then small town on Great Island in Cork Harbour in the south-east of County Cork in Ireland, on 27 February 1787. He graduated in medicine from the University of Edinburgh. He was commissioned Second Assistant Surgeon in the Ordnance Medical Department (which provided medical officers to the Royal Artillery and Royal Engineers) in 1810 during the Peninsular War. After the defeat of Napoleon and his exile in St Helena after 1815 the British decided that Napoleon needed a personal physician. The first to fill that post was another Irishman, Barry Edward O'Meara, but he was dismissed as it was felt he was too close to Napoleon. Verling had already been a surgeon on board the ship HMS Northumberland, which brought Napoleon to St Helena, and was chosen to replace O'Meara and to Spy on Napoleon by Hudson Lowe who was general of the Island at that time. He never treated Napoleon only saw him from a distance. He was never replaced, but Napoleon's mother Leatia brought over another doctor to treat Napoleon.

After Napoleon's death in 1821, he helped in his autopsy, which carried out the verdict of death was stomach cancer.

Verling returned home to the Cove of Cork (now Cobh) in 1822, where he lived at Bella Vista (which is now The Bellavista Hotel) in Ballyvaloon until his death on New Year's Day, 1 January 1858. The Cove of Cork was renamed as Queenstown in 1849. He was promoted First Assistant Surgeon, Surgeon in 1827, and Senior Surgeon in 1843. He is buried in the Old Church Cemetery (also called Clonmel cemetery), Cobh.
