= Cobh Heritage Centre =

- Ionad Oidhreachta an Chóibh

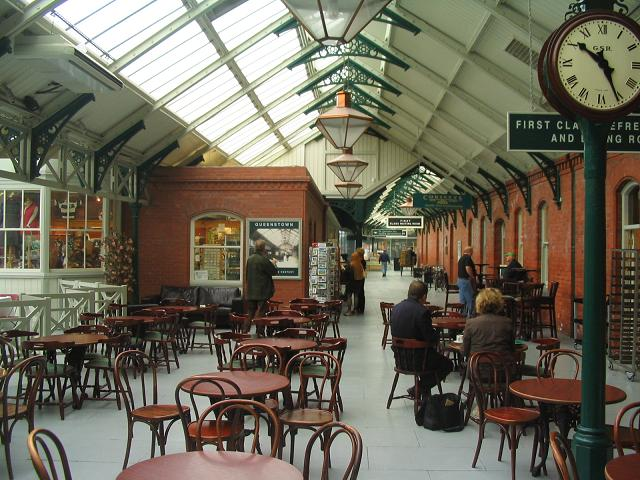
- interior

- Location within Ireland
- Established: 1993
- Location: Cobh, County Cork, Ireland
- Coordinates: 51.8488°N 8.299367°W
- Type: Heritage centre, railway museum
- Public transit access: Cobh railway station
- Website: cobhheritage.com

The Cobh Heritage Centre is a museum located in Cobh, County Cork, Ireland. It is attached to Cobh railway station.

The "Queenstown Experience", located at the centre, has mostly permanent exhibitions of Irish history. The centre has held exhibits on life in Ireland through the 18th and 19th centuries, mass emigration, the Great Famine, Cork Harbour's defences, on penal transportation to Australia, and on the sinking of the RMS Lusitania. It also has displays on the history of the RMS Titanic, whose last port of call was at Cobh (then Queenstown). The centre also hosts temporary exhibitions and, for example, hosted exhibits on John Philip Holland (loaned from the County Louth Museum) in 2000.

The centre is a tourist destination, including with visitors from cruise ships, which often dock in Cobh. The centre has two onsite gift shops and a café.

The building was damaged on 5 May 1995, when a train arriving at Cobh failed to stop, and crashed through the wall.
