= Fota railway station =

Railway station in Ireland

Fota Fóite
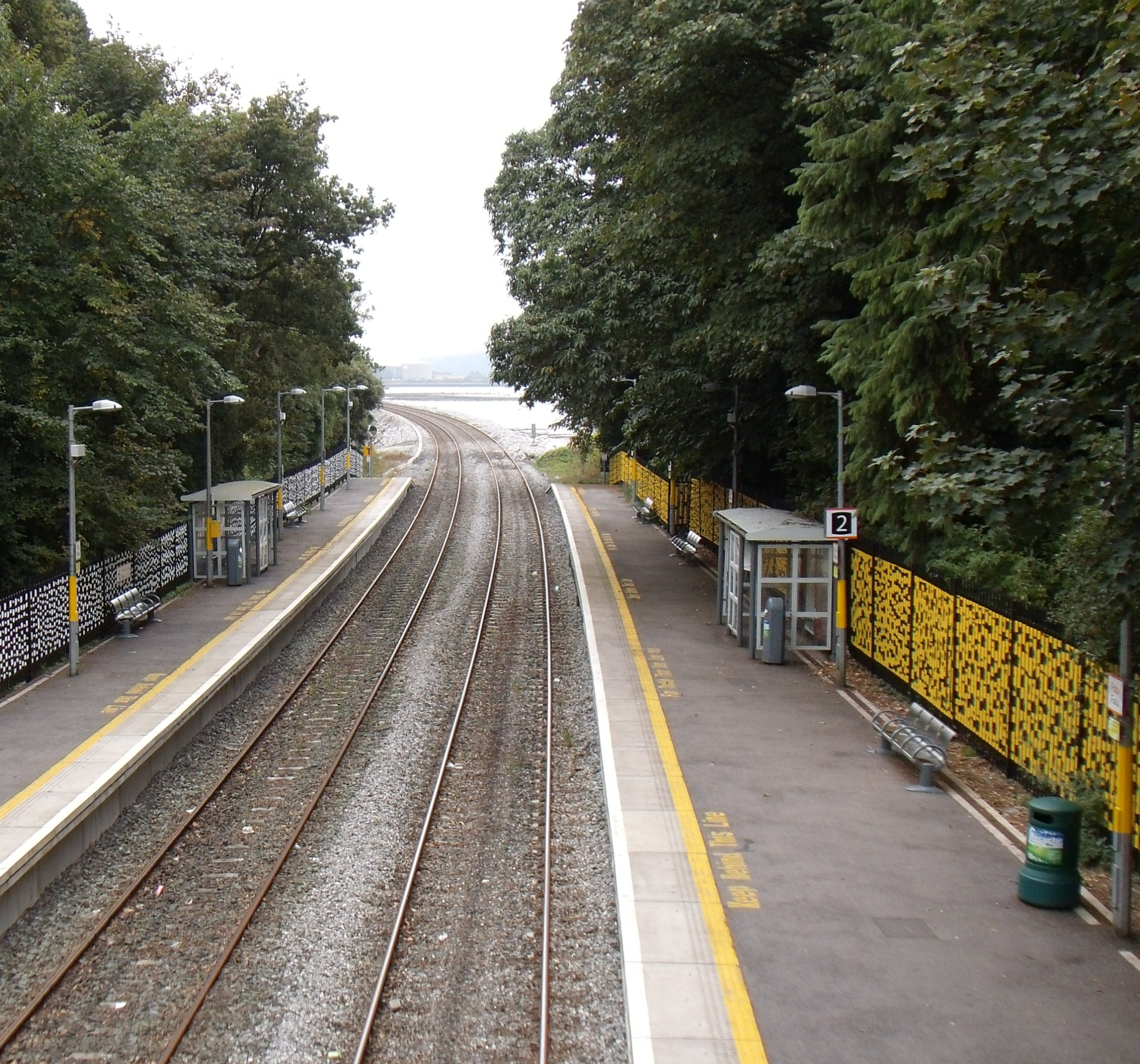

General information
- Location: Fota Island; Ireland
- Coordinates: 51.8963°N 8.3181°W
- Owner: Iarnród Éireann
- Platforms: 2

Construction
- Structure type: At-grade

History
- Opened: 1 July 1865

Services
Preceding station	Iarnród Éireann	Following station
Glounthaune towards Cork Kent	Commuter Cork–Cobh	Carrigaloe towards Cobh
Route map
Location

Fota railway station serves Fota Island in County Cork.

It is a station on the Cork to Cobh commuter service. Travel to Glounthaune station to transfer to Midleton.

== Description ==
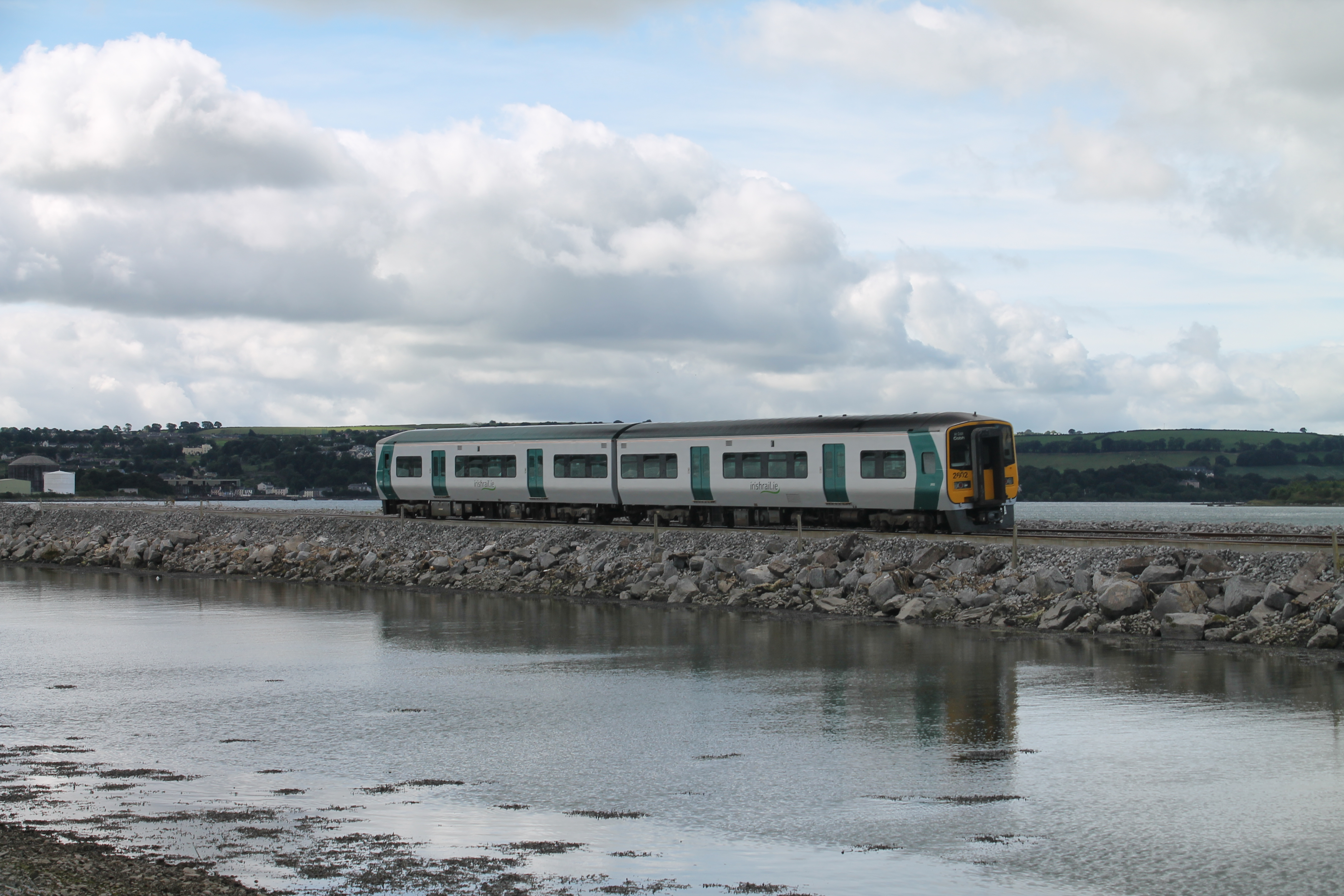
A 2600 approaches the Belvelly viaduct, just to the South of Fota station

The halt is unstaffed. There are two platforms, with level access to the Cobh-bound platform. Access to the Cork-bound platform is via a footbridge, although there is a defunct level crossing which can theoretically (albeit illegally) be used to cross the tracks.

At both ends of the station is a viaduct; The Belvelly viaduct is at the Cobh end and the Slatty Viaduct is at the Cork end.

It is used by tourists, walkers, and people working on the Island alike. Fota Island is home to a wildlife park, scout camp, Fota House and Gardens, a championship golf course and hotel.

== History ==
The station opened on 1 July 1865.

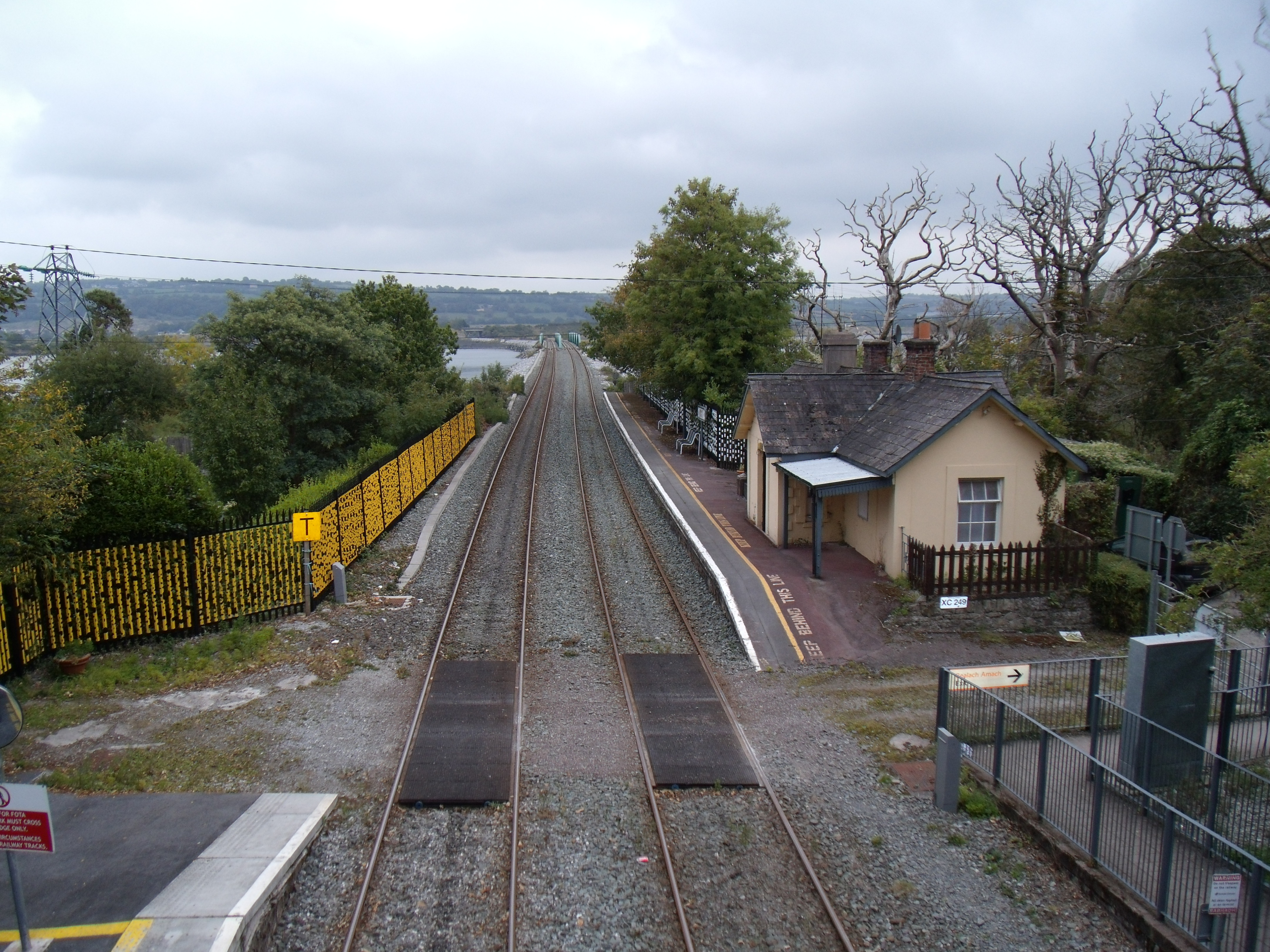
Disused platform north of the station still with Íarnród Éireann signs and modern benches as of 2011

== See also ==
- List of railway stations in Ireland
