= Great Island =

Island in Cork Harbour, Ireland

Native name: An tOileán Mór
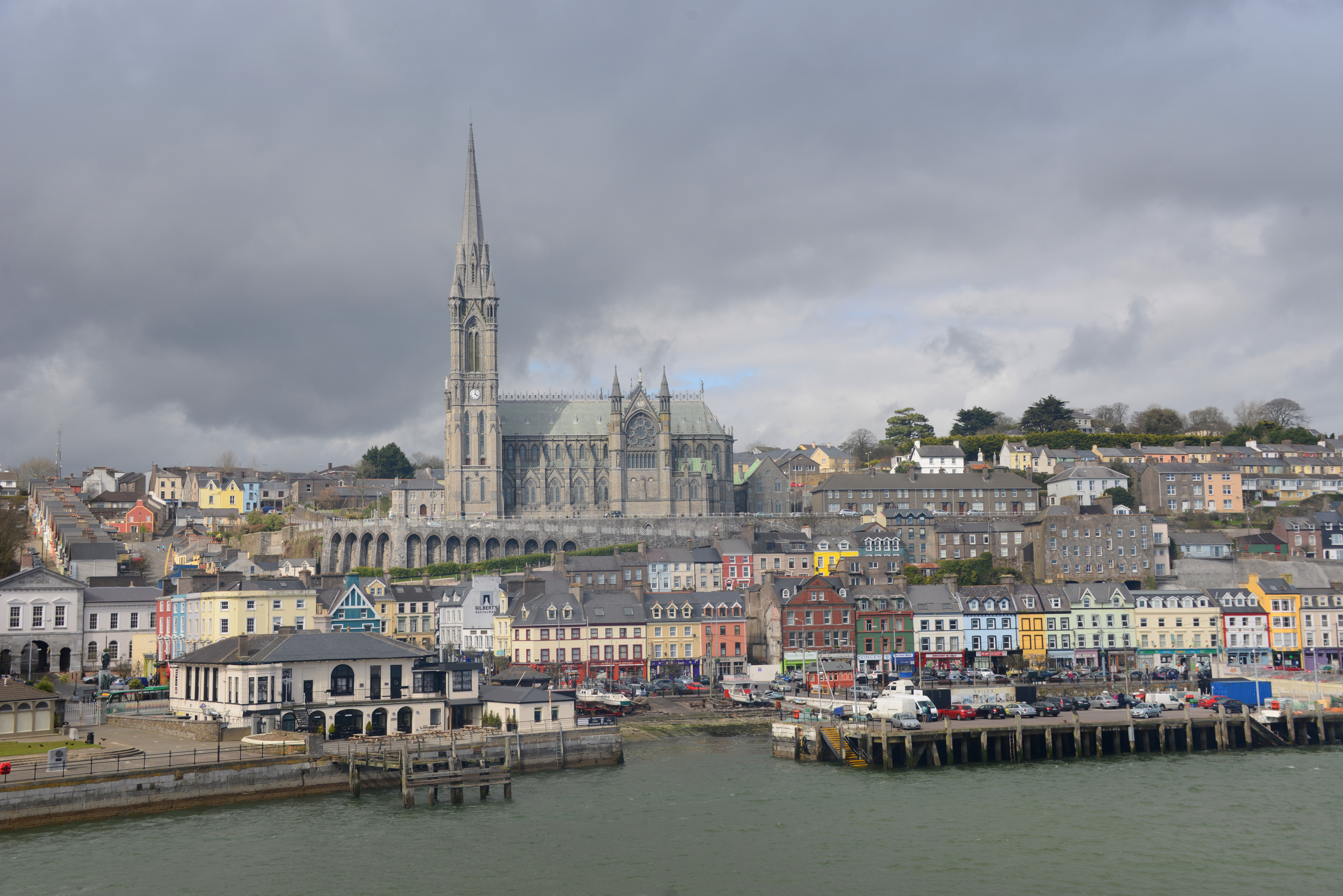
- Cobh, the largest town on Great Island.

- Location within County Cork

Geography
- Location: Cork Harbour
- Coordinates: 51°51′57″N 08°16′02″W
- Area: 53.1 km^{2} (20.5 sq mi)
- Length: 8 km (5 mi) east>west (approx)
- Width: 4 km (2.5 mi) north>sth (approx)

Administration
- Ireland
- County: County Cork

Demographics
- Population: Approximately 14,000

Great Island (Irish: An tOileán Mór) is an island in Cork Harbour, at the mouth of the River Lee and close to the city of Cork, Ireland. The largest town on the island is Cobh (called Queenstown from 1849 to 1920). The island's economic and social history has historically been linked to the naval, ship-building, and shipping activities in the town's environs.

In the early 21st century, a different marine industry has arisen. Tourism and related services have become a significant part of the local economy, including cruise ships attracted by the Port of Cork berthing facilities on the island. This is the only dedicated cruising ship berth in the Republic of Ireland.

The island has an area of 53.1 km^{2} (13,100 acres), making it Ireland's second-largest after Achill.

== History ==
The ancient name of the island was Ard-Neimheadh, the "High (or important) island of Neimheadh". According to the 11th-century work Lebor Gabála Érenn, Neimheadh was the leader of a group who invaded the area in prehistoric times. Archaeological evidence of prehistoric and early medieval settlement on Great Island is recorded on the Record of Monuments and Places of the National Monuments Service. This includes records of ringfort, fulacht fiadh, holy well, and bee bole structures.

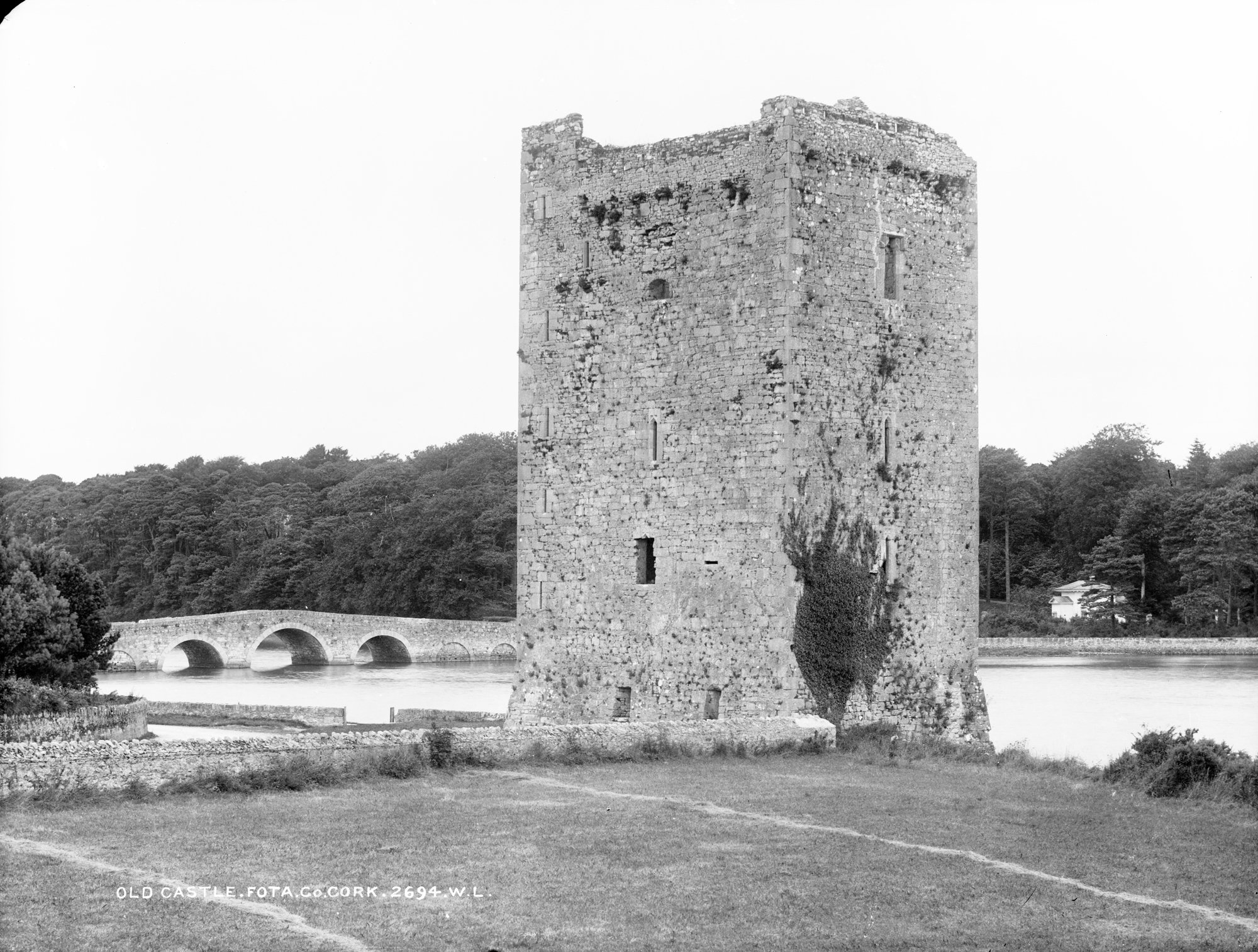
Belvelly Castle overlooks the narrowest crossing, site of the only road bridge to the mainland.

By the early 13th century, the island was under the control of the Anglo-Norman Hodnett family. The Hodnetts built several structures, including Belvelly Castle, to defend the island and its approaches. The island and its defenses were taken by the de Barra (Barry) family in the 14th century. The Barry family (later Earls of Barrymore) retained power in the area for several centuries, and the island became known as "Barrymore Island" or Oileán Mór an Bharraigh, meaning "Great island of the Barrys".

In the 18th and 19th centuries, due to the strategic importance of the island within Cork Harbour (overlooking the naval berths and military bases at Haulbowline and Spike Island), several coastal defence fortifications were built on Great Island. These included construction by the British of Cove Fort (between Cobh and Cuskinny) in the 18th century and several Martello towers (at Belvelly, Monning and Rossleague) in the 19th century.

The largest settlement on Great Island, Cobh, had significant development during the 19th and early 20th centuries, stimulated by additional expansion in shipping and naval activity in the area.

== Location and access ==
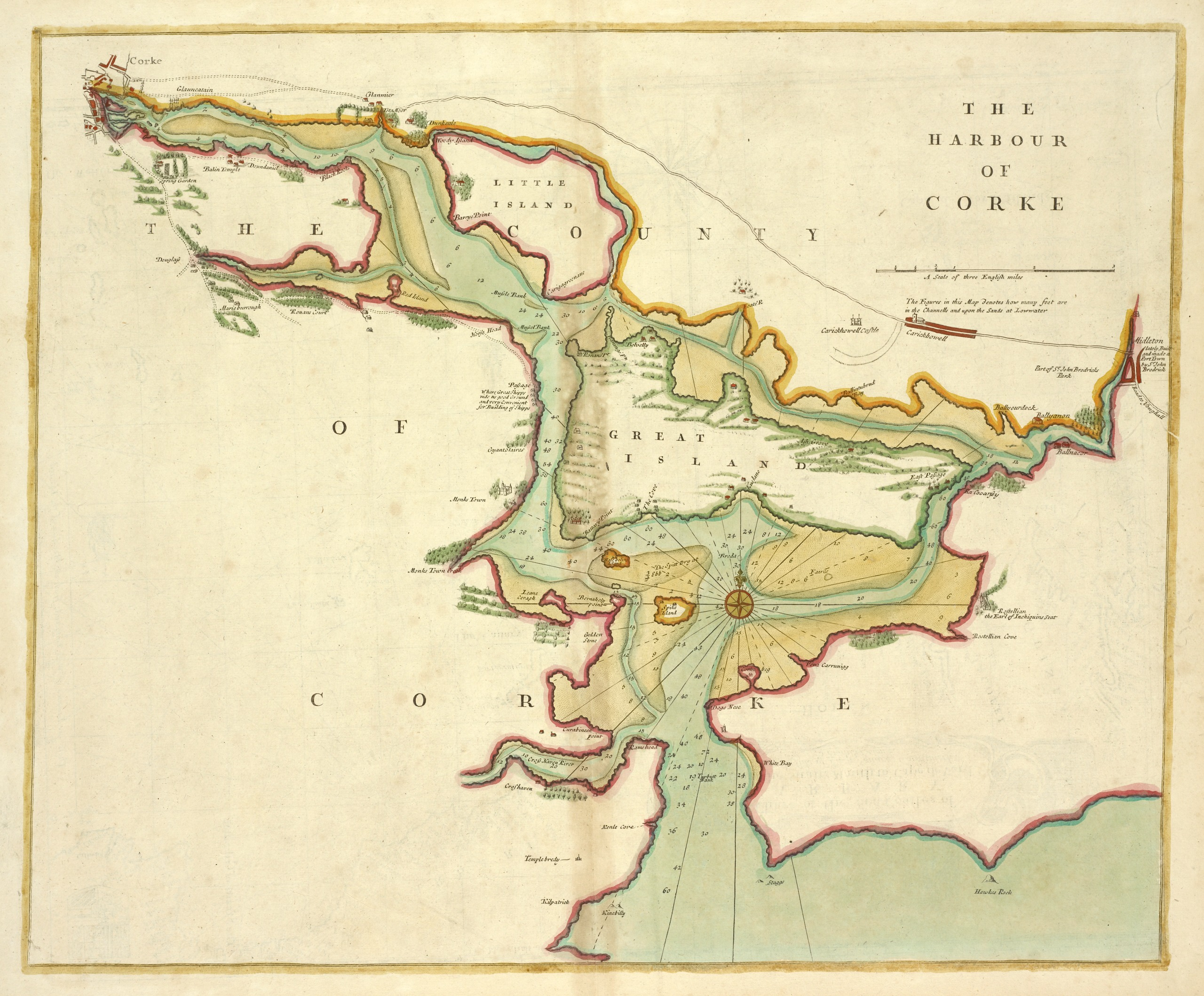
Early 18th century map of Cork Harbour showing Great Island (centre)

Great Island is located in Cork Harbour on Ireland's south coast, and is made-up of the civil parishes of Clonmel and Templerobin.

The island is connected by road bridge to Fota Island to the north – which, in turn, connects via a causeway to the mainland. This road bridge, Belvelly Bridge, was built in 1803 at one of the narrowest points in the channels around Great Island. More than 200 years old, it is the only road bridge to the island.

A railway bridge and rail line also runs out through Fota Island to Great Island. Railway stations on Great Island include Carrigaloe station and Rushbrooke station, and the terminus at Cobh. A ferry service also connects the island (from a point near Carrigaloe) to the mainland (at a point near Passage West).

During regional windstorms in 2017 (including Storm Ophelia), downed trees and high winds resulted in the closure of the only road bridge to Great Island. Ferry and rail services were cancelled, leaving 12,000 residents stranded on the island. This led to some calls for a review of emergency access provisions and plans for the island.

== Land use and economy ==
In the 19th century Topographical Dictionary of Ireland (published by Samuel Lewis in 1837), Great Island is described as "very fertile" with its "light productive soil" supporting agricultural uses with "two-thirds [of the island] under tillage, and the remainder in pasture or included in demesnes". Lewis describes the island's location, environment and climate as factors "induc[ing] many genteel families to settle here".

As of the 21st century, land use on Great Island remains primarily agricultural and residential in nature. The island has a population of between 12,000 and 14,000. While some of this population work on the island, as of the early 21st century, an increasing percentage of the island's residents commute to Cork city for work, traveling by car, Cork Commuter Rail, and bus services to the city. Residential developments are concentrated mainly around Cobh, with other populated townlands and settlements on the island including Ballymore, Ballynoe, and Belvelly.

Prior to the 21st century, land use included industrial zones, such as the former Irish Fertilizer Industries plant at Marino Point, and the Verolme Cork Dockyard at Rushbrooke. The latter was long the site of construction of vessels for the Irish Naval Service, such as the LÉ Eithne. Many of these heavy industries have since closed. Some smaller boatbuilding companies are still based at Cobh.

Tourism is now important to the island economy. As of 2017, Great Island was the location of the only berth in the Republic of Ireland dedicated for visiting cruise ships. 90 cruise ships and 170,000 passengers visited the berth in 2025. As of 2019, the Port of Cork company were seeking to redevelop the deepwater quay to support additional cruise liner and cargo traffic, leading to conflict with some local resident groups over the privatisation of public land.

== Ecology ==
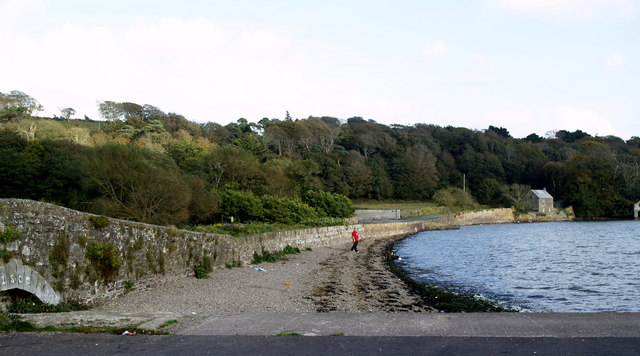
The waterfront at Cuskinny, 4 km (2 mi) east of Cobh

Several proposed conservation sites and green areas are located on and around the island. These include Cuskinny Marsh Nature Reserve (which is managed by BirdWatch Ireland), Marlogue Wood (operated by Coillte), and the Great Island Channel Special Area of Conservation (overseen by the National Parks and Wildlife Service). The latter, the Great Island Special Area of Conservation, proposes conservation controls (including aquaculture limits) to protect the animal and bird habitats of the area's salt marshes.

Cuskinny Marsh is notable as a habitat and breeding grounds for a variety of different bird species such as kingfishers and cormorants.

Larger fish and marine mammals like bottlenose dolphins, harbour porpoises and seals can sometimes be seen in the Great Island Special Area of Conservation. Between June and August 2001 a pod of three Killer Whales took up residence between Cuskinny Bay and the Holy Ground, sometimes within 100m of the shore, returning there regularly for the night following hunting activity in the lower harbour area. A large blue shark was recorded just off the island in mid-2018.

== See also ==
- List of coastal fortifications of County Cork
