= Joseph Wheeler (shipbuilder) =

Irish shipbuilder

Joseph Wheeler began building and repairing ships in the early 19th century using derricks and slips on the Brickfield slobs off the Strand Road, Cork. By 1829 he had moved to a yard on the Lower Glanmire Road where he built a patent slip. In the 1850s he moved, this time to a purpose-built yard at Rushbrooke that was built around a large drydock designed by Sir John Rennie the Younger. While at the Lower Glanmire Road yard, Wheeler built a number of wooden ships including his largest, the 500-ton Mary Hardy.

In 1842 Wheeler lived at 20 Grand Parade, Cork and in 1867 he is recorded as having lived at Westlands, Queenstown (Cobh).

== Sources ==
- Rynne, Colin (1999). The Industrial Archaeology of Cork and Its Environs, Duchas The Heritage Society
- Rynne, Colin (2006). Industrial Ireland 1750 - 1930: An Archaeology, The Collins Press
