= Belvelly =

Village in County Cork, Ireland

Belvelly Béal an Bhealaigh
- Village
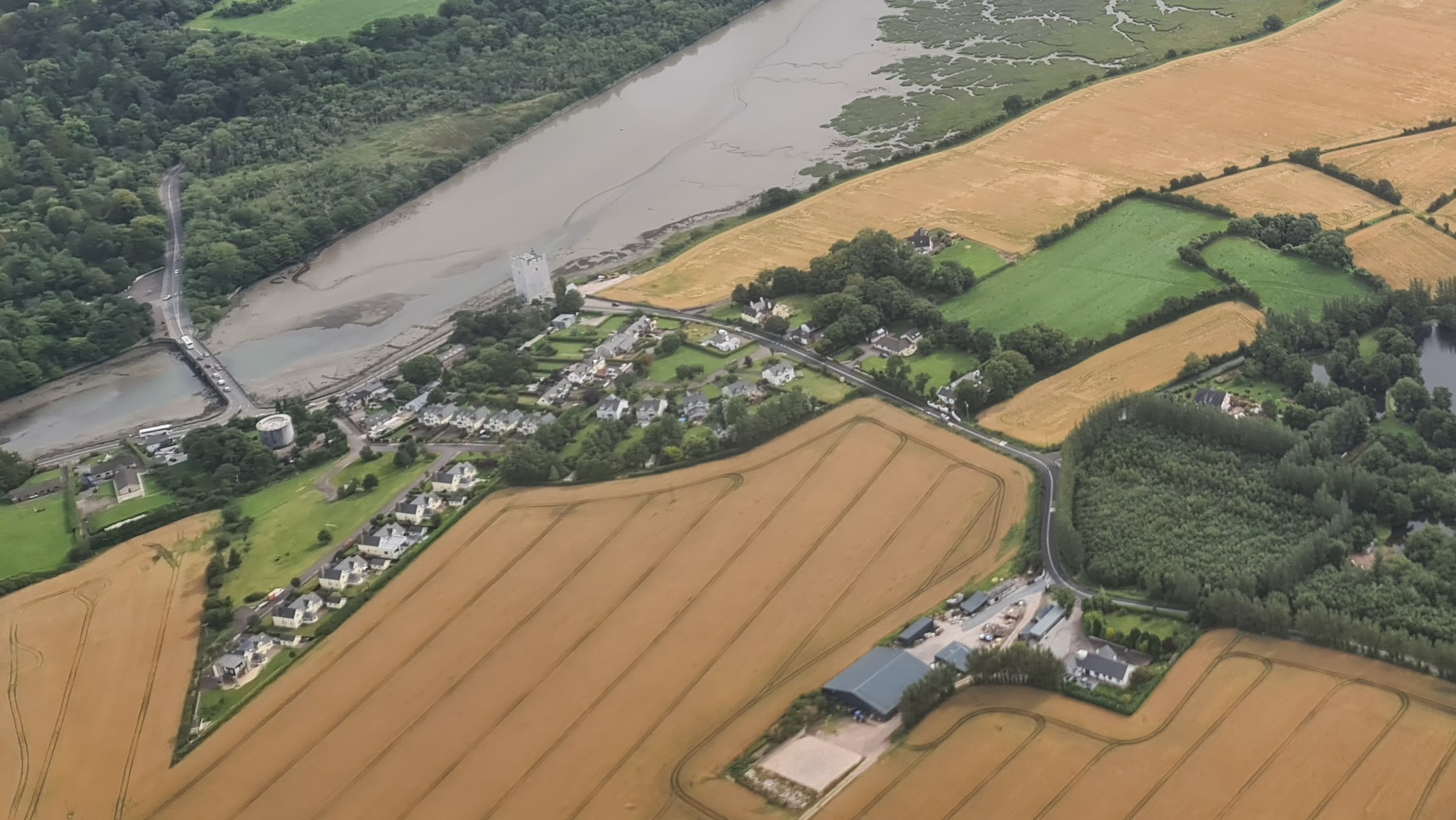
- Aerial view of Belvelly's bridge, castle and Martello tower at the channel with Great Island

- Location in Ireland
- Coordinates: 51°53′N 8°18′W
- Country: Ireland
- Province: Munster
- County: County Cork
- Time zone: UTC+0 (WET)
  - Summer (DST): UTC-1 (IST (WEST))

Belvelly (Irish: Béal an Bhealaigh, meaning 'mouth of the roadway') is a small village on the northern end of the Great Island of Cork Harbour, about four miles north of the town of Cobh, County Cork, Ireland. Belvelly is situated at the shortest crossing point between Great Island and the neighbouring Fota Island. Belvelly Bridge (built in 1803) connects Great Island to Fota Island, which is in turn connected to the mainland near Carrigtwohill.

The village has a number of historic buildings; Belvelly Castle, Belvelly Martello Tower and a nineteenth century red-brick school house. The castle was built by the Hodnett family around the 15th century to the annoyance of the more powerful de Barry family, who later seized the castle.

The three primary buildings at Belvelly have now been converted into dwellings. The schoolhouse at Belvelly was converted into a dwelling in 1990s, while the castle and the Martello tower were converted into family homes during the early 21st century. Because of the 13-foot-thick (4.0 m) walls and its status as a historical monument, limited structural changes could be made to the Martello tower, with most light coming from the roof area. The restoration of Belvelly castle included the construction of new perimeter walls and a separate garage.

== See also ==
- List of towns and villages in Ireland
