= Carrigaloe railway station =

Railway station in County Cork, Ireland

Carrigaloe Carraig an Ló
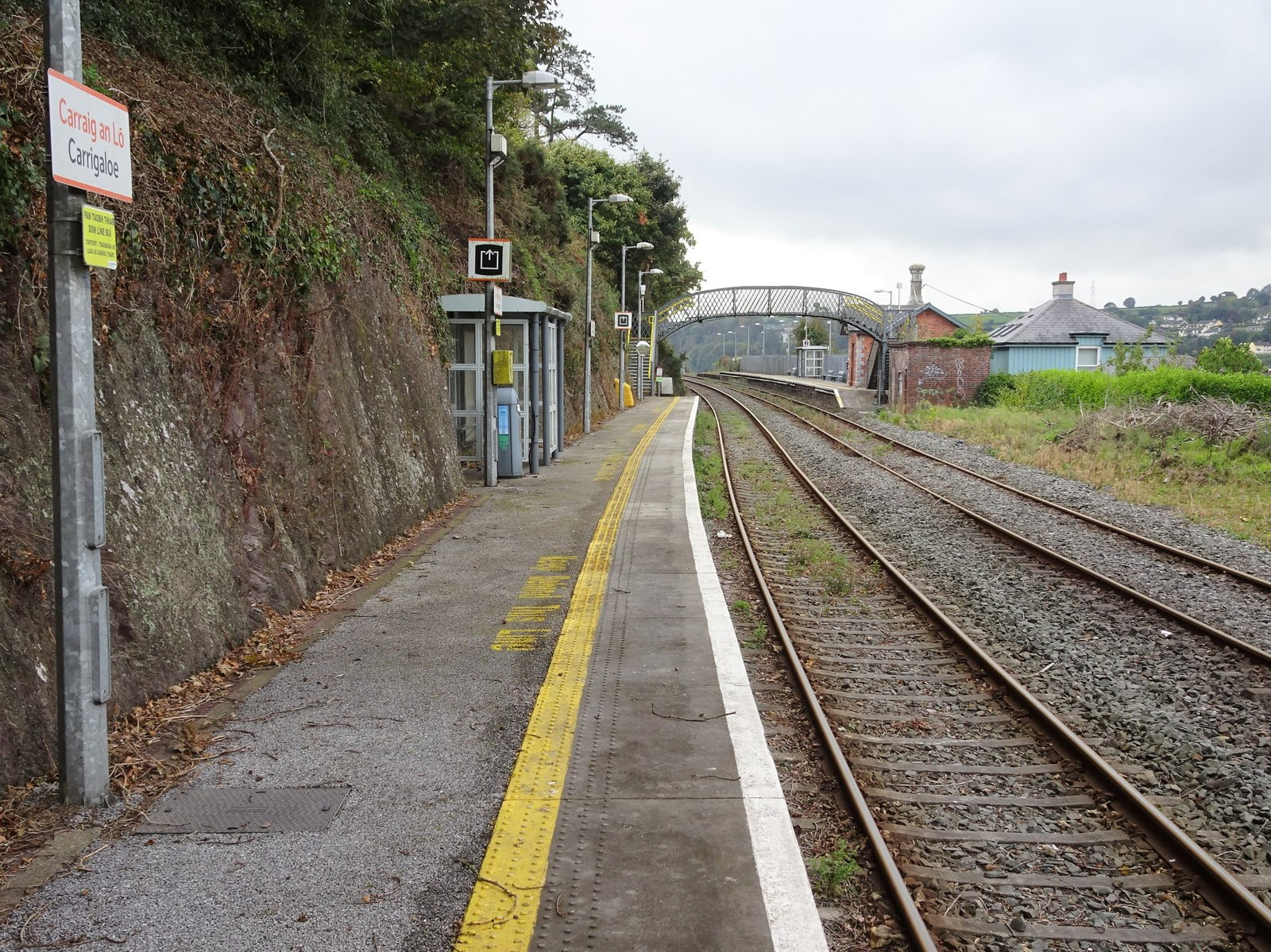
- Carrigaloe railway station, County Cork

General information
- Location: Cóbh; Ireland
- Coordinates: 51°51′56″N 8°19′31″W
- Owner: Iarnród Éireann
- Platforms: 2
- Bus operators: Barrys Coaches
- Connections: 200

Construction
- Structure type: At-grade

History
- Opened: 10 March 1862

Services
Preceding station	Iarnród Éireann	Following station
Fota towards Cork Kent	Commuter Cork–Cobh	Rushbrooke towards Cobh
Route map
Location

Carrigaloe railway station serves Carrigaloe on Great Island in County Cork.

It is a station on the Cork to Cobh commuter service. Passengers can travel to Glounthaune station to transfer to Midleton.

== Description ==
The station is unstaffed and only the Cork-bound platform is accessible by wheelchairs. A footbridge accesses the Cobh-bound platform.

Cross River Ferries connects Carrigaloe to Passage West on the other side of the harbour. The crossing from Glenbrook (Passage West) to Carrigaloe takes 4 minutes and runs daily without the need of reservation.

== History ==
The original station opened on 10 March 1862. Although the station closed to goods traffic in December 1974, it continues to serve passenger traffic.

== See also ==
- List of railway stations in Ireland
