= Rushbrooke, County Cork =

Suburb of Cobh, County Cork, Ireland

Rushbrooke
- Population Centre
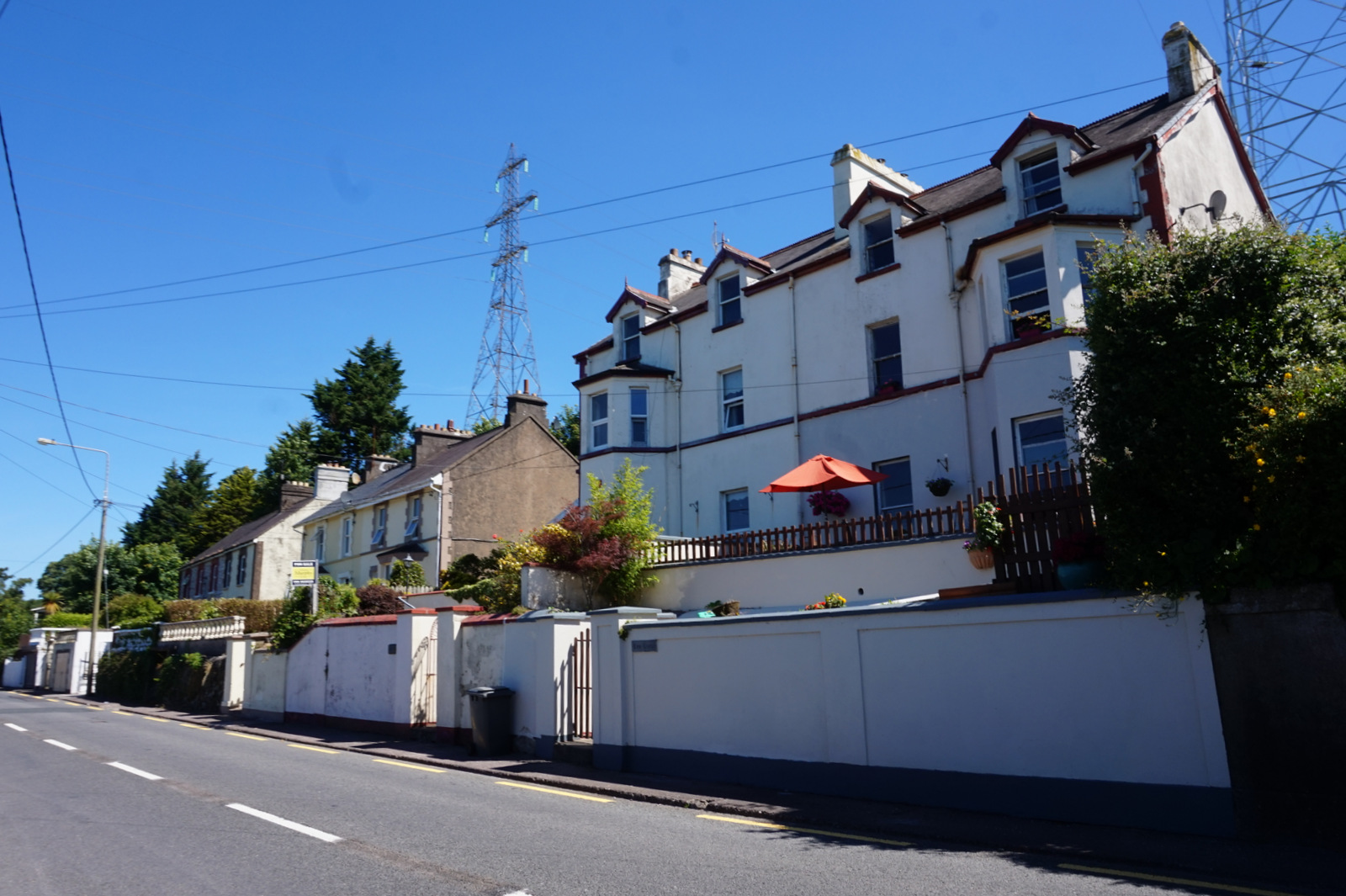
- Houses on Carrig View, Rushbrooke

- Location in Ireland
- Coordinates: 51°51′00″N 08°19′00″W
- Country: Ireland
- Province: Munster
- County: County Cork
- Time zone: UTC+0 (WET)
  - Summer (DST): UTC-1 (IST (WEST))

Rushbrooke is a populated area on the western side of Cobh on Great Island in Cork Harbour, Ireland. It is in the townland of Ringacoltig (Irish: Rinn an Chabaltaigh, meaning 'headland of the navy').

== History and development ==
The area is named after Frederica Harriet Rushbrooke and her son and daughter who were granted lands under the 'Midleton Act' (1850). This followed the suicide of George Brodrick, 5th Viscount Midleton (1806-1848), who died by inhaling charcoal on 1 November 1848. Succession to the titles and estate was court challenged and ultimately settled by Private Act of the House of Lords.

Land in Surrey, England and Ireland were settled on the Rushbrookes from the estates of Earl Broderick/Viscount Midleton, who became known as the 'most wretched man in the world' by his aristocratic peers in England. Much disapproved of was his association with Augustus Welby Northmore Pugin, the renowned Catholic architect and father of E W Pugin who later designed Cobh Cathedral. Even more disapproved of was his unorthodox relationships.

Rushbrooke contains a number of Victorian era houses, while several newer housing estates have been built in the Rushbrooke area in more modern times.

== Industry ==
Located on the shoreline of Cork harbour, Rushbrooke has a long tradition of ship and boat-building. The docks at Rushbrooke were founded by Joseph Wheeler and became the home of the former Dutch-owned Verolme Cork Dockyard which once employed over 1,100 people in shipbuilding. Many large ships were built and launched from Verolme. This included a number of vessels, such as LÉ Eithne, which were built for the Irish Naval Service which has its headquarters nearby. The dockyard closed in the mid 1980s with major job losses, and was subsequently redeveloped into a commercial and small industries park - while Cork Dockyard Holdings Ltd continues with ship and boat repair.

== Sport ==
Rushbrooke has the oldest tennis club in Ireland, the Rushbrooke Lawn Tennis and Croquet Club, which runs a number of tournaments each year.

== Transport ==
Rushbrooke also has a railway station on the main Cork to Cobh line, located close to the Cork Dockyard Commercial Development, Rushbrooke railway station, which opened on 10 March 1862 and closed for goods traffic on 2 December 1974.

A bus service between Cork and Cobh, operated by Cobh Connect, also stops at the entrance to Rushbrooke Links.

== See also ==
- List of populated places in the Republic of Ireland
