= Cobh =

Seaport in County Cork, Ireland

Cobh An Cóbh (Irish)
- Town
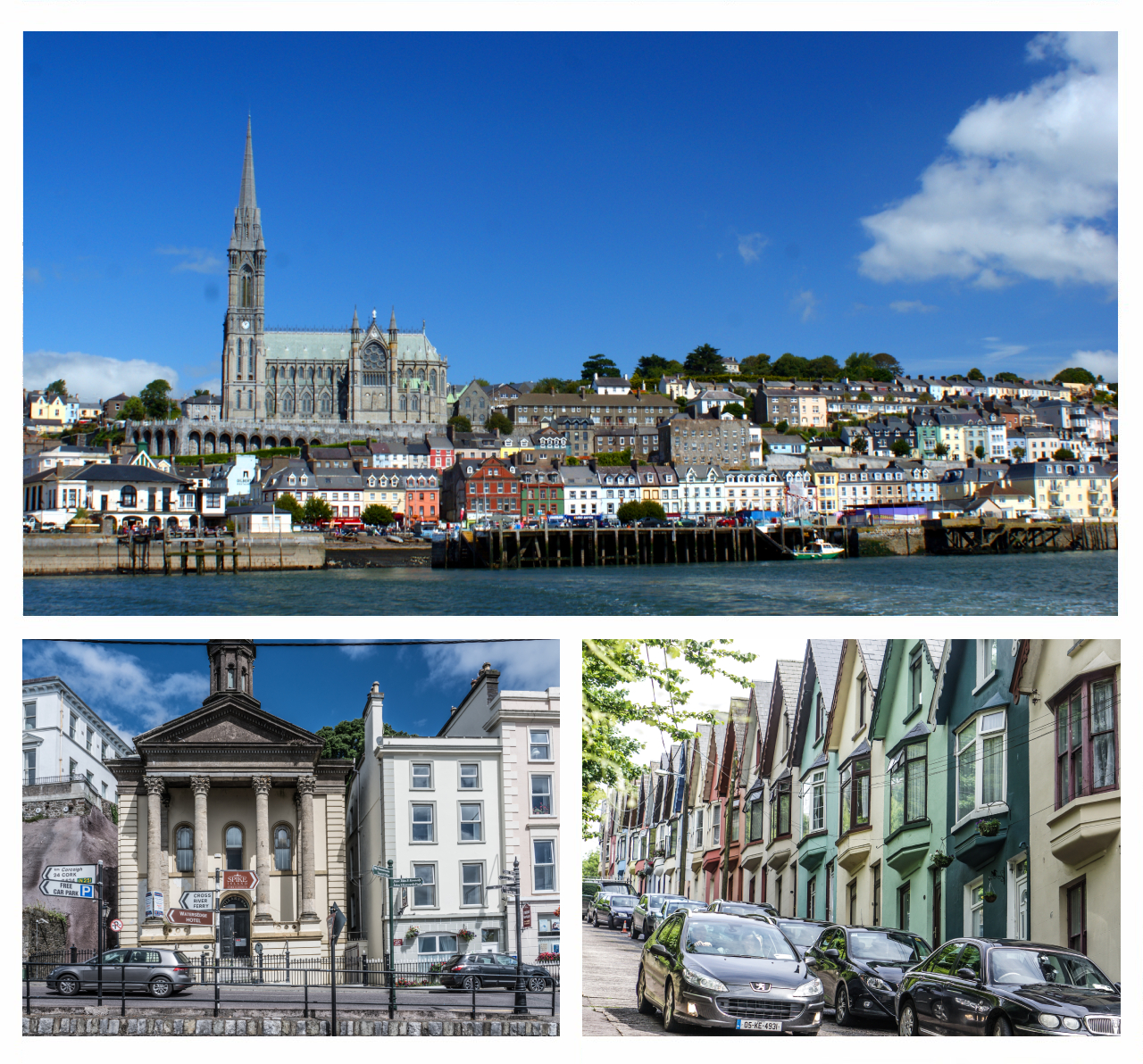
- Clockwise from top: Cobh and St Colman's Cathedral as seen from Cobh Harbour; a row of Victorian houses known locally as the "deck of cards"; and the neoclassical former Methodist Church

- Coat of arms
- Motto: Statio Fidissima Classi ("The Fleet's Safest Post") (Latin)
- Location in Ireland
- Coordinates: 51.851°N 8.2967°W
- Country: Ireland
- Province: Munster
- County: County Cork
- Dáil Éireann: Cork East

Area
  - Urban: 5.1 km^{2} (2.0 sq mi)
- Elevation: 47 m (154 ft)

Population (2022)
  - Town: 14,148
  - Density: 2,774.1/km^{2} (7,185/sq mi)
- Time zone: UTC±0 (WET)
  - Summer (DST): UTC+1 (IST)
- Eircode routing key: P24
- Telephone area code: +353(0)21
- Irish Grid Reference: W793666
- Website: visitcobh.com

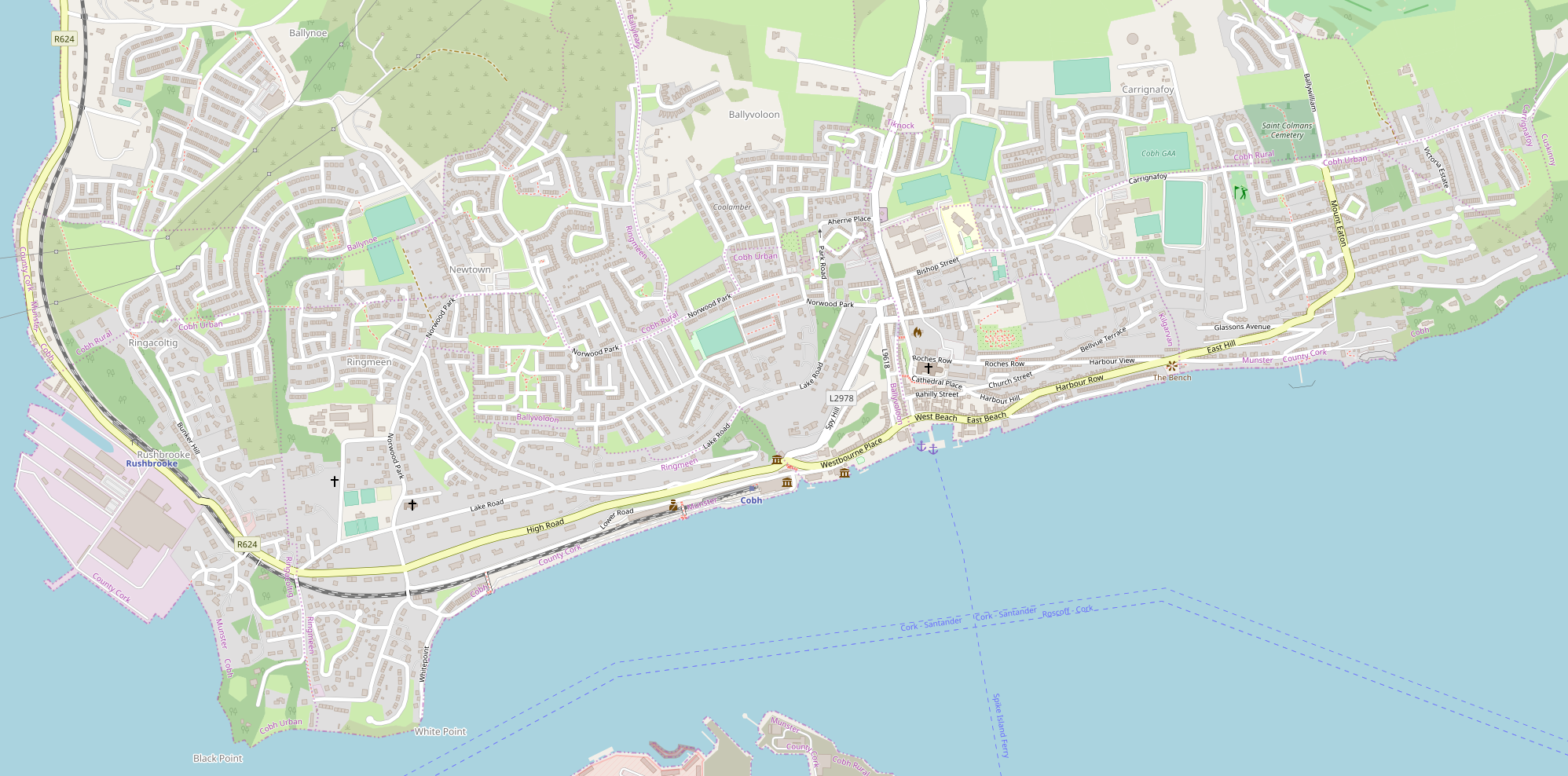
Map of Cobh

Cobh (/ˈkoʊv/ KOHV, Irish: An Cóbh), known from 1849 until 1920 as Queenstown, is a seaport town on the south coast of County Cork, Ireland. With a population of 14,148 inhabitants at the 2022 census, Cobh is on the south side of Great Island in Cork Harbour and home to Ireland's only dedicated cruise terminal. Tourism in the area draws on the maritime and emigration legacy of the town.

Facing the town are Spike and Haulbowline islands. On a high point in the town stands St Colman's, the cathedral church of the Roman Catholic Diocese of Cloyne. It is one of the tallest buildings in Ireland, standing at 91.4 metres (300 ft).

== Name ==
The village on Great Island was known as "Ballyvoloon", a transliteration of the Irish Baile Ui-Mhaoileoin (English: "O'Malone's town"), while the Royal Navy port, established in the 1750s, became known as "The Cove of Cork" or "Cove". The combined conurbation was renamed to "Queenstown", in 1849, during a visit by Queen Victoria. The name was changed to Cobh, during the Irish War of Independence, following the passing of a motion by the local administrative council on 2 July 1920. Cobh is a Gaelicisation of the English name Cove, and it shares the same pronunciation. It has no meaning in the Irish language.

In ancient times the area was known as Cuan an Neimheadh (the Harbour of Neimheidh), a figure in medieval Irish legend. Great Island was called Oileán Ard Neimheidh (the high or important island of Neimheidh).

== History ==
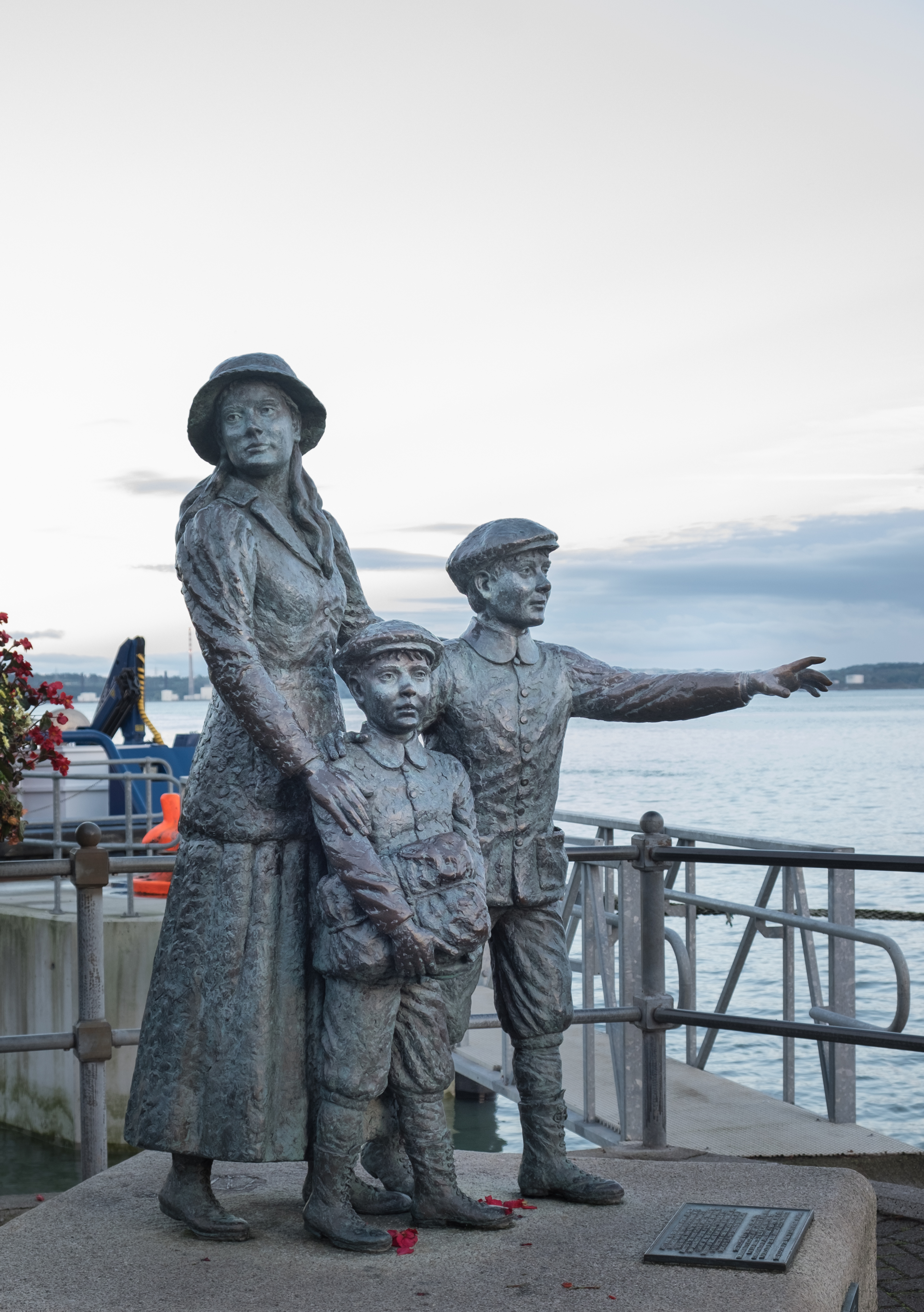
Statue on the waterfront of Annie Moore and her brothers. Annie Moore was the first person to be admitted to the United States of America through the new immigration centre at Ellis Island, New York, on 1 January 1892.

=== Early history ===
According to legend, one of the first colonists of Ireland was Neimheidh, who landed in Cork Harbour over 1,000 years BC. He and his followers were said to have been wiped out in a plague, but the Great Island was known in Irish as Oilean Ard Neimheadh because of its association with him. Later it became known as Crich Liathain because of the powerful Uí Liatháin kingdom, who ruled in the area from Late Antiquity into the early 13th century. The island subsequently became known as Oilean Mor An Barra (the Great Island of Barry & Barrymore), after the Barry family who inherited it.

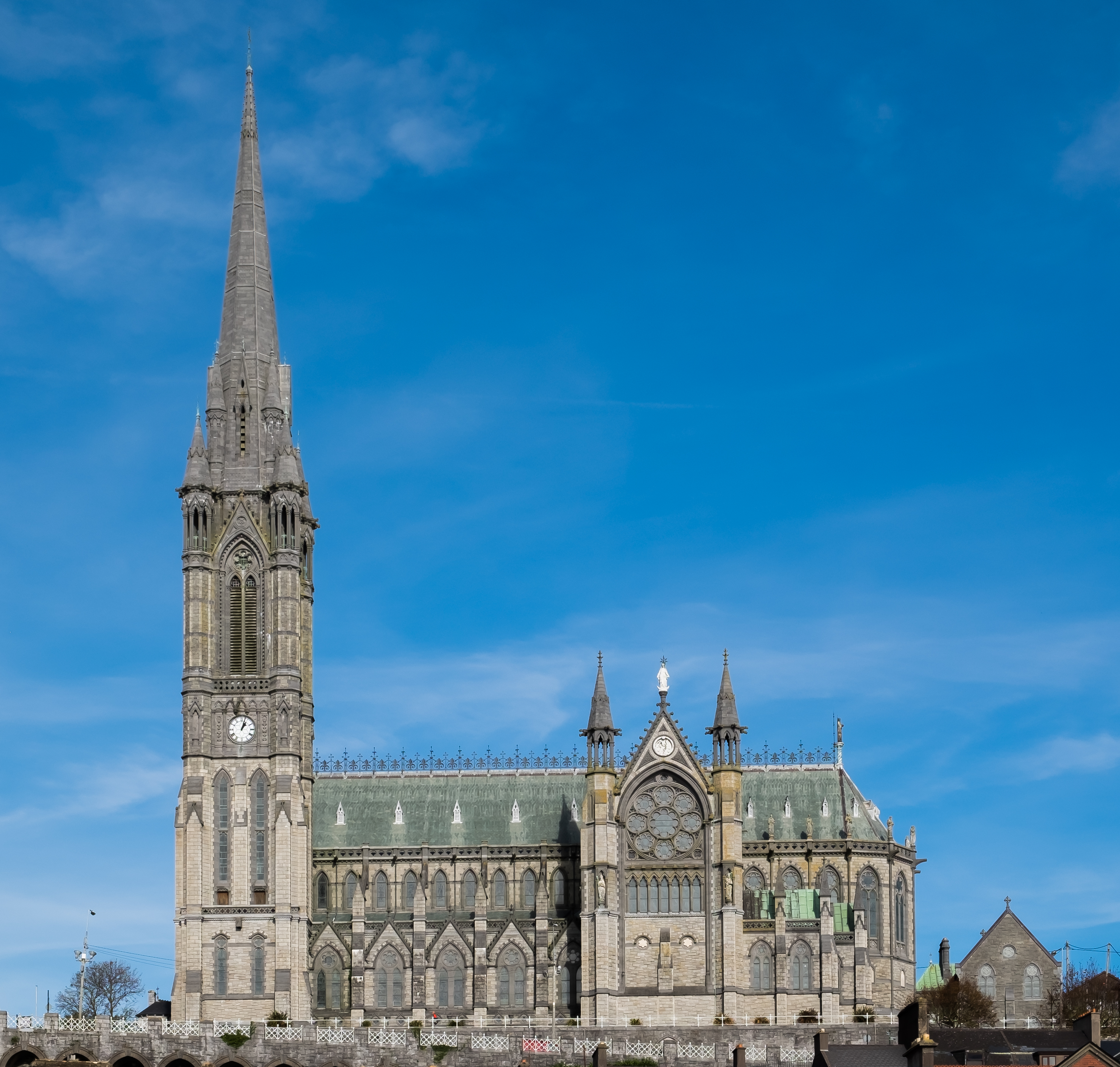
St. Colman's Cathedral

The village on the island was known in English as Ballyvoloon, overlooking "The Cove". In 1743, the Dublin Castle administration built a fort, later to become known as Cove Fort, to the east of the village. The settlement was first referred to as Cove village in 1750 by Smith the historian who said: "it was inhabited by seamen and revenue officials". The Cork directory of 1787 shows about thirty businesses in the town, including one butcher and one draper.

The Water Club established at Haulbowline in 1720 was the progenitor of the present Royal Cork Yacht Club (RCYC, now based in Crosshaven) and is the oldest yacht club in the world. The RCYC was based for many years in Cobh and the present Sirius Arts Centre used to be a clubhouse of the RCYC organisation. In 1966, the RCYC merged with the Royal Munster Yacht Club, retaining the name of the RCYC but moving its headquarters to those of the RMYC at Crosshaven at the other side of the harbour.

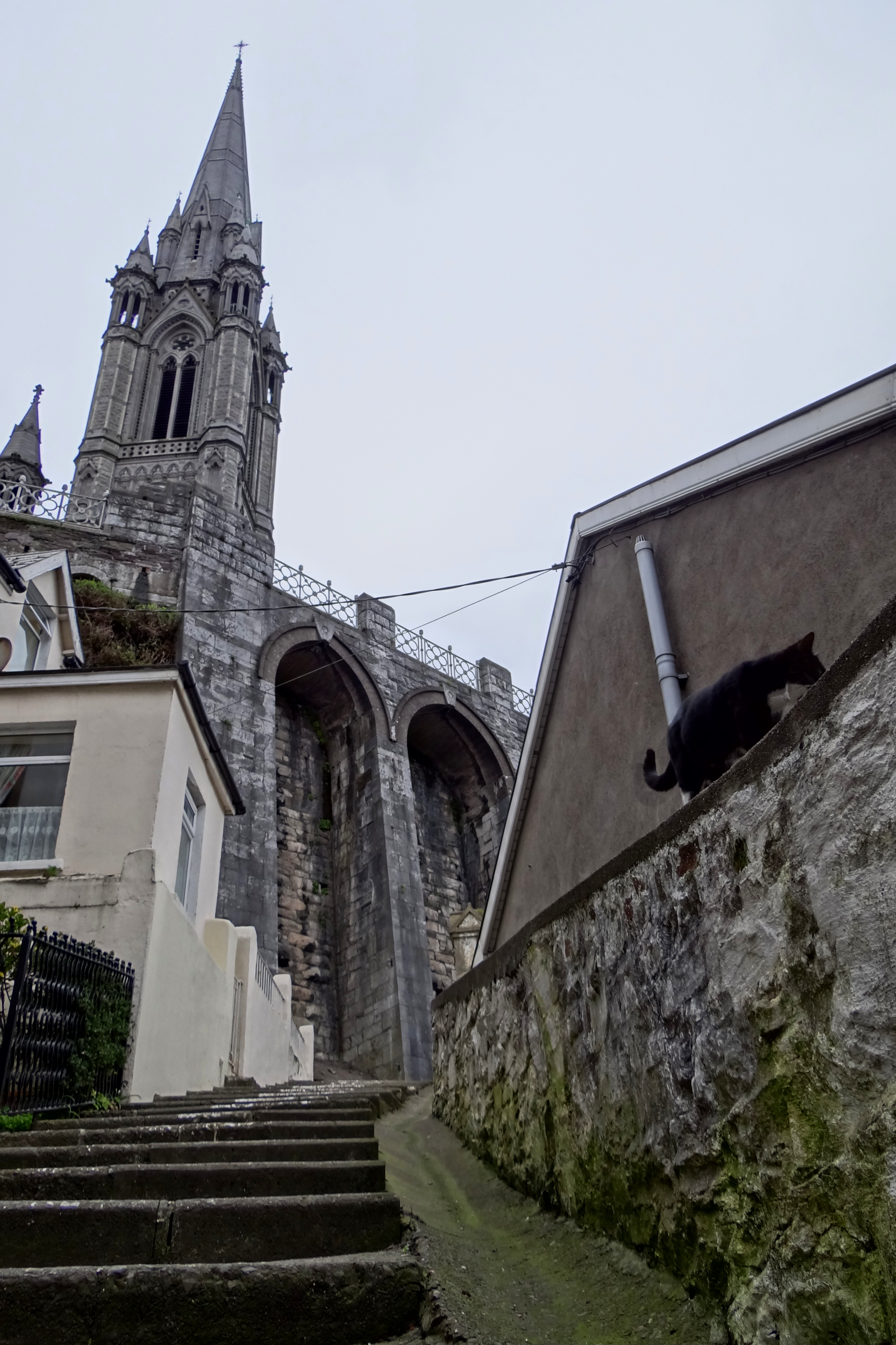
The tower of St. Colman's Cathedral from the streets below

=== 19th century ===
International upheaval led to Cobh undergoing rapid development in the early 19th century. Due to the natural protection of its harbour setting, the town became important as a tactical centre for naval military base purposes, never more so than at the time of the Napoleonic Wars. Today, the Irish Naval Service headquarters is on Haulbowline Island facing Cobh.

The wars against the French led to the town, then usually known as Ballyvoloon or The Cove of Cork, being developed as a British naval port assigned an admiral. Many of the present-day buildings date from this time of build-up. George Brodrick, 5th Viscount Midleton engaged the English architect Decimus Burton to improve the streetscape and buildings during the 1840s. The eventual cessation of hostilities dented Cobh's prosperity for a while, but it soon became known as a health resort; many patients stayed here for their health because of the temperate climate. Amongst their number was Charles Wolfe, who wrote "The Burial of Sir John Moore After Corunna". Wolfe's body is buried in the Old Church Cemetery outside the town.

=== The Titanic ===
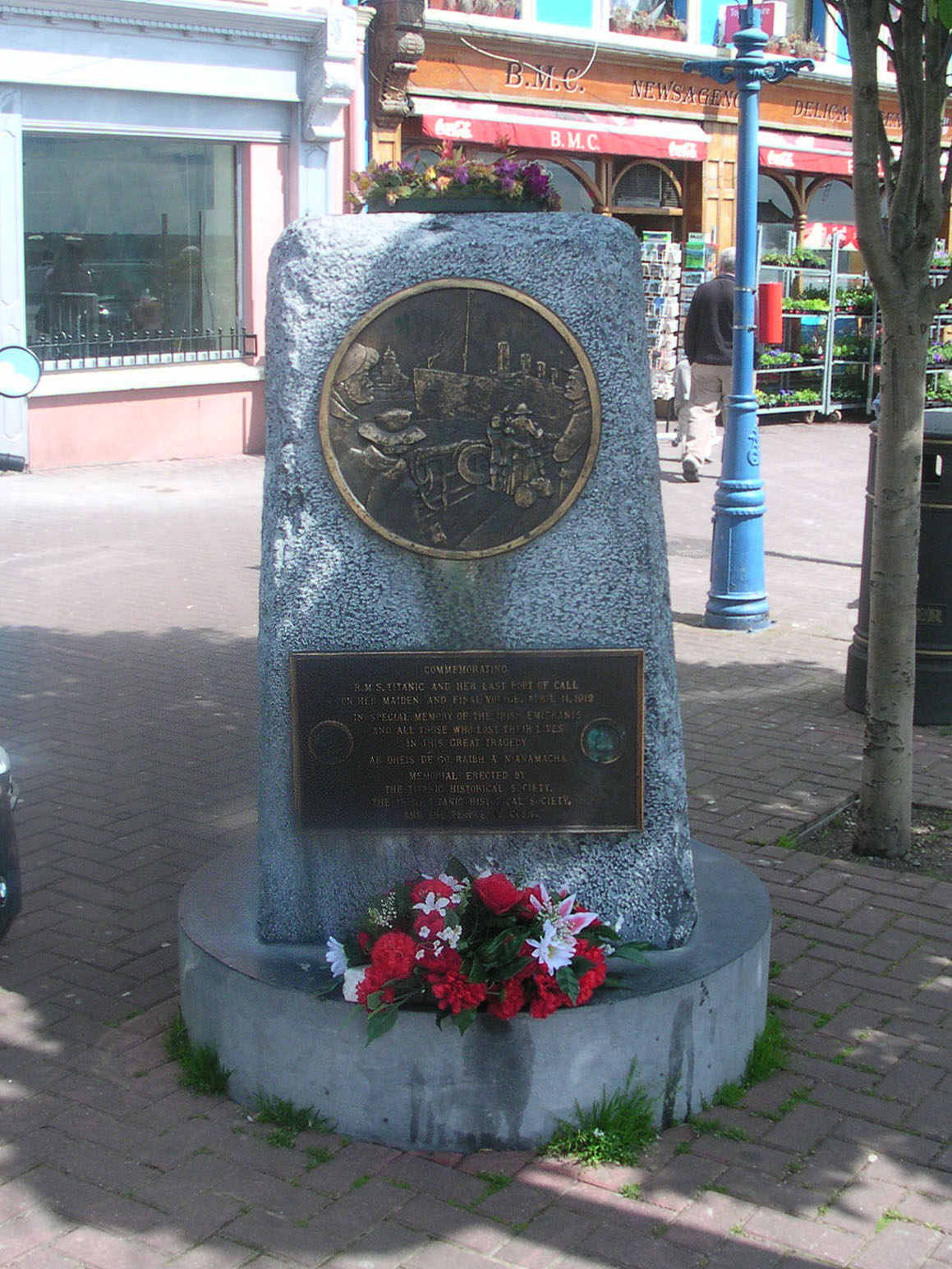
Titanic Memorial, Westbourne Place, Cobh

One of the major transatlantic Irish ports, the town was the departure point for 2.5 million of the 6 million Irish people who emigrated to North America between 1848 and 1950. On 11 April 1912, as Queenstown, it was the final port of call for the Titanic before she set out across the Atlantic on the last leg of her maiden voyage. She was assisted by the P.S. America and the P.S. Ireland, two ageing White Star Line tenders, along with several other smaller boats delivering first-class passengers' luggage. Some sources and local lore suggest that a Titanic crew member, John Coffey, a native of Cobh, left the ship at this time, thereby saving his life. 123 passengers boarded at Cobh, with only 44 surviving the sinking.

=== Penal transportation ===
Cobh was earlier a major embarkation port for men, women and children who were deported to penal colonies such as Australia. The Scots Church has since 1973 housed the Cobh Museum which holds records of such deportations in ships' log books. The Scots Church (a Presbyterian church until its 1969 closure) overlooks the harbour from where so many departed.

=== Shipbuilding ===
A significant shipbuilding industry was developed in the town. The remnants of the Verolme Shipyard today maintain many of the original cranes and hoists now forming part of industrial and maritime heritage.

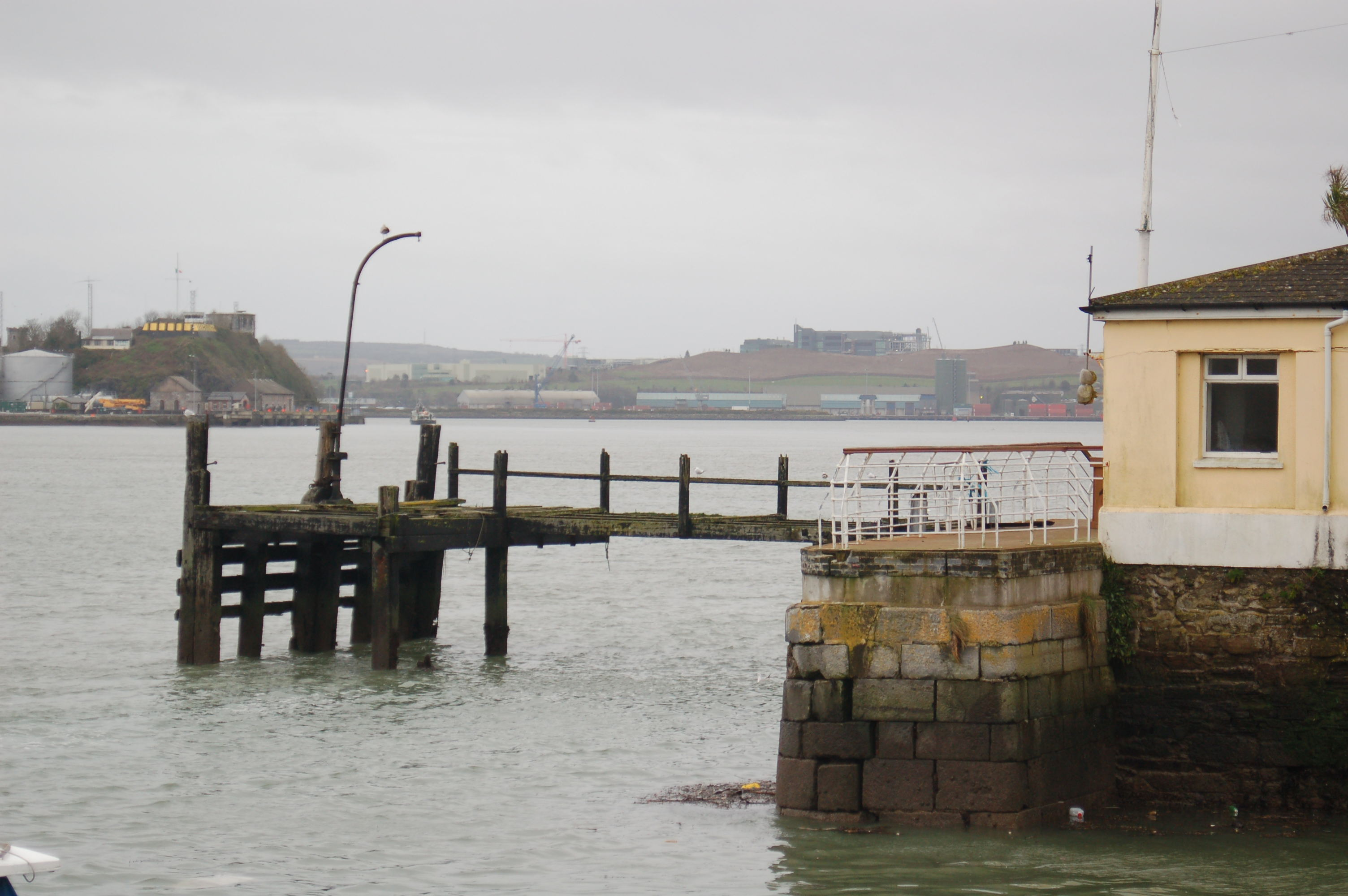
The original pier (as it appeared in 2007) where passengers boarded tenders to the Titanic at its anchorage near the mouth of the harbour. The corner of the office building of the White Star Line can be seen on the right. The building today houses a Titanic museum.

The age of steam brought Cobh association with several milestones, including the first steam ship to sail from Ireland to England (1821) and the first steamship to cross the Atlantic (Sirius 1838), which sailed from Passage West.

=== RMS Lusitania and the First World War ===
Another ship to be associated with the town, the Cunard passenger liner RMS Lusitania, was sunk by a German U-boat off the Old Head of Kinsale while en route from the US to Liverpool on 7 May 1915. 1,198 passengers died, while 700 were rescued. The survivors and the dead alike were brought to Queenstown, and the bodies of over 100 who perished in the disaster lie buried in the Old Church Cemetery just north of the town. The Lusitania Peace Memorial is located in Casement Square, in front of the Arch Building housing the Cobh Library and Tourist Information Centre.

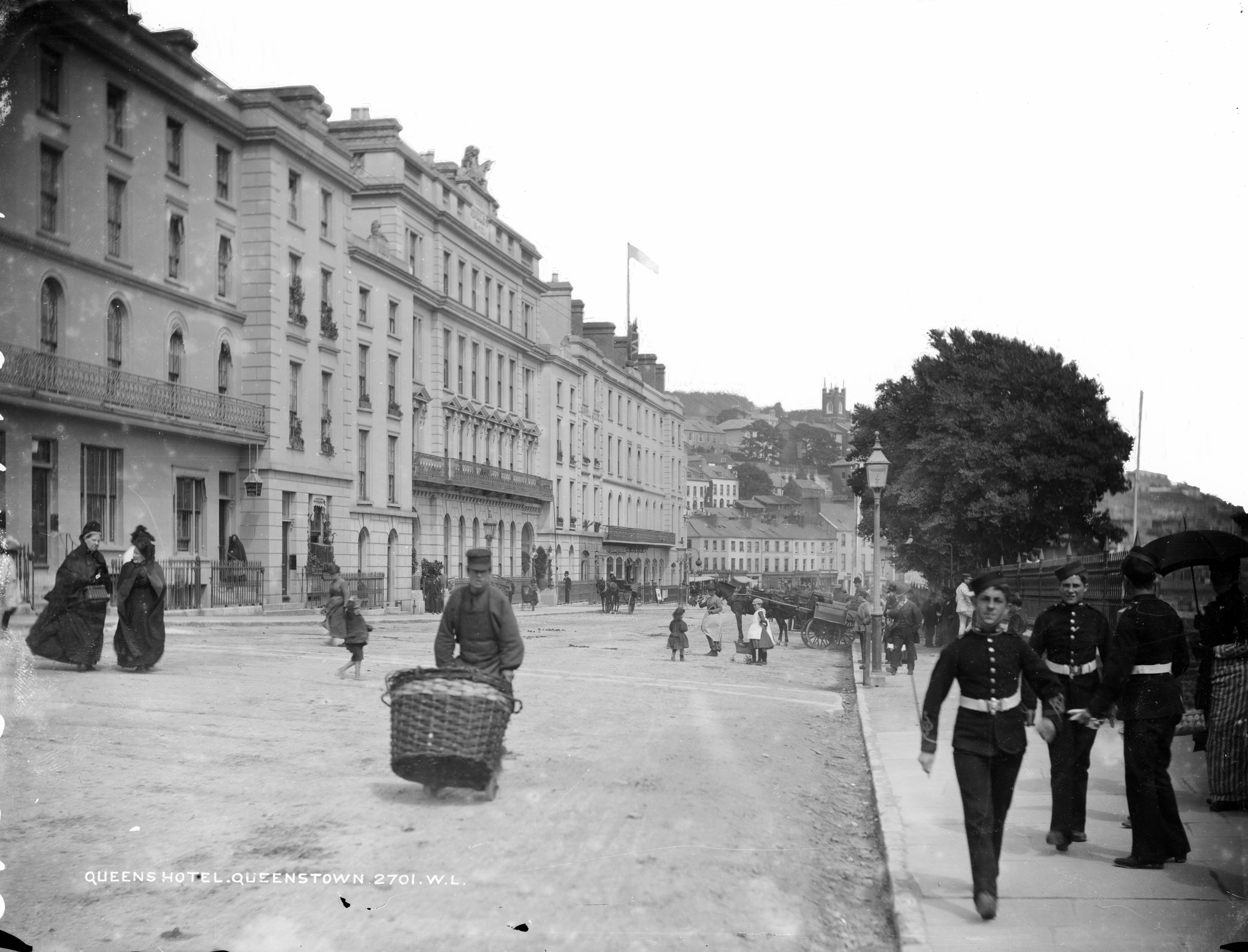
Cobh, then Queenstown, c. 1890s

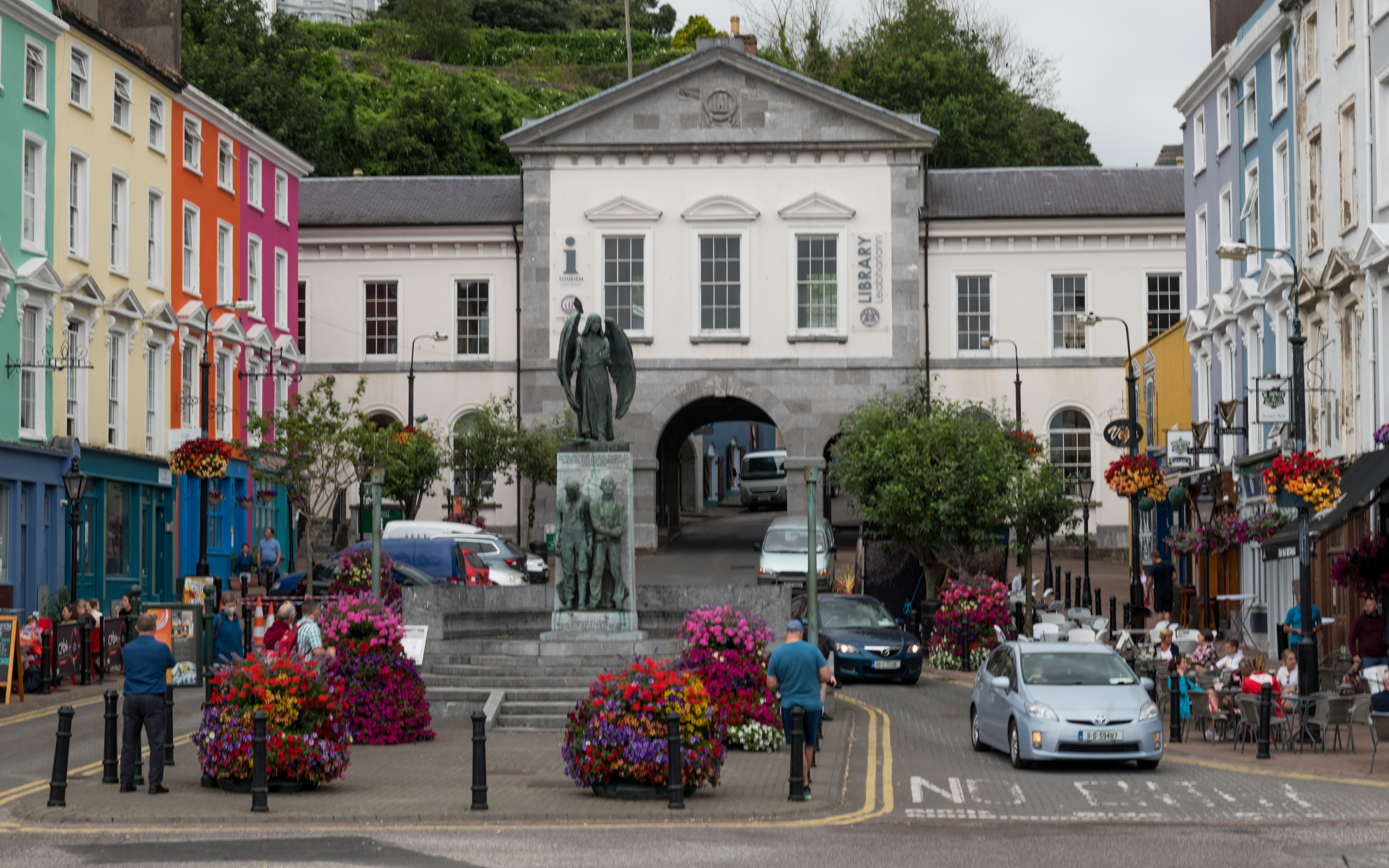
The Arch Building (background) and the Lusitania Memorial (foreground)

During the First World War, Queenstown was a naval base for British and American destroyers operating against the U-boats that preyed upon Allied merchant shipping. Q-ships (heavily armed merchant ships with concealed weaponry, designed to lure submarines into making surface attacks) were called Q-ships precisely because many were, in fact, fitted out in Queenstown. The first division of American destroyers arrived in May 1917, and the sailors who served on those vessels were the first American servicemen to see combat duty in the war. When that first convoy arrived in port after enduring a rough passage in what were little more than open boats, its members were met by a crowd of sailors and townspeople, thankful for their anticipated help towards stopping the U-boats that were blockading western Europe. Admiral Sir Lewis Bayly, commander of the Coast of Ireland station, met the senior American officer, Commander Joseph Taussig, at the dock and inquired as to how soon the weatherbeaten American ships could be put to use. "We're ready now, sir!" was the widely quoted answer from the American.

The United States Navy established U.S. Naval Air Station Queenstown in February 1918. It operated flying boats during the last months of WW1, and closed in April 1919.

Due to its tactical military importance, under the terms of the 1921 Anglo-Irish Treaty, the port remained a UK sovereign base within the Irish Free State after 1922. Along with the other Treaty Ports, it was handed over to the government of the Irish Free State in 1938.

== Economy and tourism ==
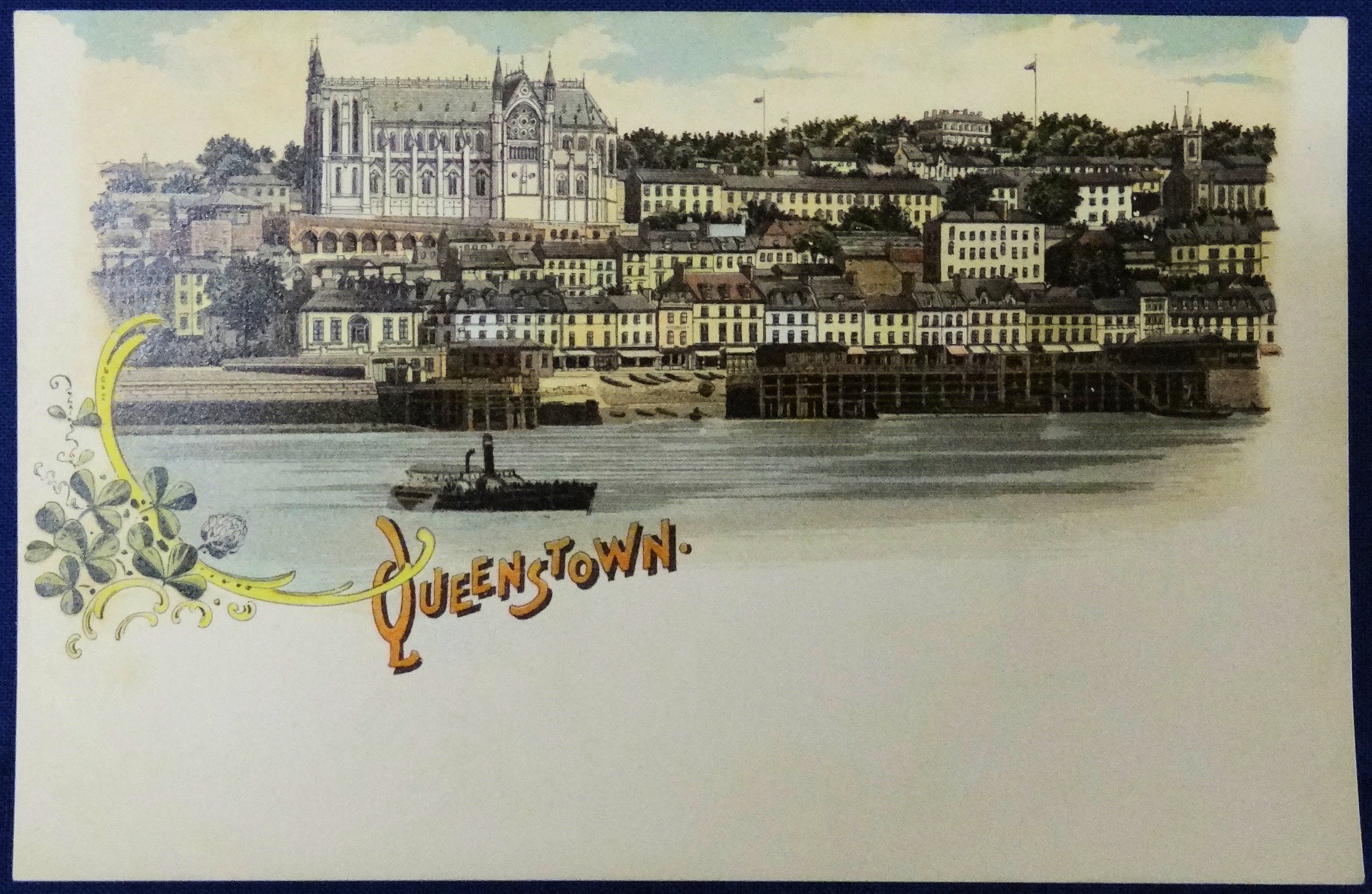
The waterfront at Cobh, probably c. 1900

Tourism is a large employer in Cobh. Large cruise liners visit Cobh each year, mainly during the summer months, although many of the tourists are transported out of Cobh by bus to other tourist destinations. In all, almost 100,000 cruise liner passengers and crew arrive in the town each year when their ships berth right in the centre of the town at the Republic of Ireland's only dedicated cruise terminal. Tourist attractions are focused on the maritime and emigration legacy of the town and include the Queenstown Story at the Cobh Heritage Centre, Titanic Experience, Titanic Trail walking tour, Cobh Museum, Cobh Road Train, Spike Island tours and St Colman's Cathedral. The town has remained largely unchanged since RMS Titanic departed from Cork Harbour in 1912, with the streetscape and piers still much the same. Facing the town are Spike Island and Haulbowline Island. The latter is the headquarters of the Irish Naval Service, formerly a British naval base.

Cobh was home to Ireland's only steelworks, the former state-owned Irish Steel works which was closed by its buyer, Ispat International (later Mittal Steel Company), in 2001. There is a controversy over the slag heap on the steelworks, where there are concerns that it may be leaching into the harbour. Another important employer in Cobh was the Dutch-owned Verolme Cork Dockyard, in Rushbrooke. It opened in 1960 but ceased operations in the mid-1980s. In 1981 the MV Leinster was built at Verolme for service on the Dublin – Holyhead route. The last ship built at Verolme was the Irish Naval Service's LÉ Eithne (P31). Ship repair work is still carried at Rushbrooke using the drydock and slip way carriages.

In the 21st century, a number of new developments were completed, such as a new retail park at Ticknock in 2008, and a leisure centre (with 25m swimming pool) in August 2007. In 2010, tours of Spike Island commenced, with tours leaving from Kennedy Pier, near the town centre.

== Transport ==
=== Rail ===
Outside of the Dublin metropolitan area, Cobh is one of the few towns in Ireland served by a commuter train service. The town is one of two termini for Cork Commuter Services. The other is Midleton. Regular commuter services run between Cork city and Cobh, calling at, among others, Fota railway station, Carrigaloe railway station, and Rushbrooke railway station, along the way. Trains run every day and the journey time to Cork is under 25 minutes.

Cobh railway station opened, as Queenstown station, on 10 March 1862 and was renamed c. 1925.

=== Air ===
The nearest airport is Cork Airport, which can be reached in 20–30 minutes from Cobh via the R624 road and the N25 road.

=== Port ===
The Port Operations Centre for Cork Harbour is located in the town. The port's harbour pilot launches are based at the Camber - a pier and dock area at the eastern end of the town.

=== Roads ===
Currently there is only a single road (the R624) and road bridge that leads onto Great Island. This road bridge, Belvelly Bridge, was built at Belvelly in 1803 at one of the narrowest points in the channels around Great Island.

=== Cross River Ferry ===
In 1993 a Cross River Ferry was established which allowed cars and passengers to travel from Glenbrook near Monkstown to Carrigaloe on the Great Island. The crossing from Glenbrook to Carrigaloe takes four minutes and runs daily. Reservations are not required.

== Local government and politics ==
In 1862, Queenstown Town Commissioners were established by a local act. In 1899, under the Local Government (Ireland) Act 1898, this body became an urban district council, with the office then located in the Old Town Hall. The body was renamed Cobh Urban District in 1920. In 2002, under the Local Government Act 2001, it became Cobh Town Council.

On 1 June 2014, under the Local Government Reform Act 2014, all town councils in Ireland were abolished, with responsibility for Cobh transferring to Cork County Council. The local electoral area of Cobh elects six councillors and also forms one of eight municipal districts in the county.

The town is part of the Dáil constituency of Cork East.

== Arts and culture ==
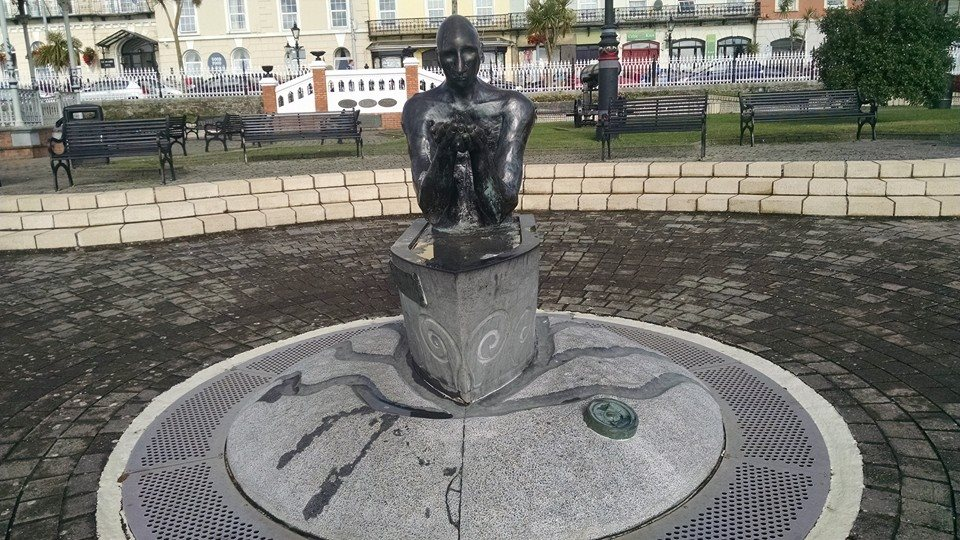
The Navigator sculpture by Mary Gregoriy, located in Cobh

The Sirius Arts Centre is a hub for the arts in Cobh and is located on the waterfront. It hosts cultural events and music concerts both in-house and around Cobh.

The Cobh Peoples Regatta is held every year around August, and includes onstage performances from local musicians and performers as well as a pageant to decide the 'Regatta Queen'. The festival typically ends with a fireworks display over the harbour.

Cobh was the setting for the 2009 Connor McPherson film The Eclipse, and also used as a filming location for the 1999 movie Angela's Ashes.

== Education ==
Cobh has several primary and secondary schools, including Colaiste Muire secondary school and Carrignafoy Community College. Scoil Iosaef Naofa is a boys' primary school in the town, and has reached the Sciath na Scoil finals (in hurling and gaelic football) on several occasions.

== Sport ==
Cobh GAA is the local GAA club, and has a centre for gaelic games at Carrignafoy.

Cobh Pirates RFC are the town's rugby union club, and compete at underage and other levels. The club celebrated its 125th anniversary in 2015. They play their home games at 'The Paddocks' in Newtown, where facilities include a gym, two playing pitches, a training pitch and a rubber training surface. The Cobh Pirates Ladies team was formed circa 2010.

The most noted football team in the area is Cobh Ramblers, where Roy Keane started-out before transferring to English side Nottingham Forest, and Stephen Ireland started his career with the club's underage, Springfield Ramblers. Cobh Ramblers play in the League of Ireland First Division, with home games at St Colman's Park.

Cobh Golf Club has an 18-hole championship course at Marino on the main R624 road into the town. Cobh is also home to one of the oldest existing tennis clubs in Ireland, Rushbrooke Lawn Tennis & Croquet Club, founded in 1870.

There are two coastal rowing clubs in the area, Cobh Fishermen and Rushbrooke Rowing Club, with the latter established in 1989. Other events on the water include the "Escape from Spike Island" triathlon, which was first held in 2012 and organised by Cobh Triathlon Club. It takes place annually in late summer.

There are two Scouting Ireland groups in Cobh, one of which is a Sea Scout group.

Panorama of Cobh taken at twilight

== People ==
- Anne Elizabeth Ball (1808–1872) and Mary Ball (1812–1898), sisters and scientists in the history of phycology
- Robert Ball (1802–1857) brother of Anne and Mary Ball, zoologist
- Decimus Burton (1800–1881), English architect and designer of much of Cobh's streetscape
- Nellie Cashman (1845–1925), gold prospector and philanthropist who was born near Cobh or at Midleton
- Patsy Donovan (1865–1953), major league baseball player in the US
- Charles Guilfoyle Doran (1835–1909), Fenian and clerk of works for the building of Cobh Cathedral, lived in the town most of his life
- Jack Doyle (1913–1978), boxer, actor and singer
- Frederick Edwards (1894–1964), recipient of the Victoria Cross
- Joe English, round-the-world sailor and international yachtsman
- Robert Forde (1875–1959), Antarctic explorer
- Maeve Higgins, comedian
- Stephen Ireland, former Manchester City and Republic of Ireland international footballer
- Roy Keane, former Manchester United footballer, started his professional career with Cobh Ramblers
- Ann Lovett (1968-1984), Irish schoolgirl who was born in Cobh. She later moved to County Cavan and subsequently to County Longford, where she died in January 1984 aged 15. The circumstances of her death caused a national scandal.
- Sean McLoughlin, Hull City footballer
- Elizabeth Louisa Moresby (1862–1931), fantasy writer
- John O'Flynn, footballer
- Seán Ronayne (b.1988), ornithologist and writer
- Fergus O'Rourke (1923–2010), zoologist resident in Cobh while Professor at University College Cork
- Thomas H. O'Shea (1898–1962), Irish Volunteer and labour leader
- Sonia O'Sullivan, silver medalist in the 5000 m race at the 2000 Sydney Olympic Games
- Fiona Shaw, actress, born here in 1958
- Sinéad Sheppard, local councillor and former member of pop band Six
- James Roche Verling (1787–1858), personal physician to Napoleon Bonaparte during his exile in St. Helena
- Patrick Walsh (1931–2023), emeritus bishop of Down and Connor, originally from Cobh
- Joseph Wheeler, 19th century founder of the Rushbrooke ship yard

== Twin towns ==
- Kolbuszowa, Poland
- Ploërmel, France
- Lake Charles, Louisiana, US
- Pontarddulais, Wales

== See also ==
- List of towns and villages in Ireland
- Metropolitan Cork
- Queenstown, a prospective town on Killiney Hill, Dublin which was never built
