= Fota Island =

Island in Cork Harbour, Ireland

Native name: Oileán Fhóta
- Location within County Cork

Geography
- Location: Cork Harbour
- Coordinates: 51°53′57″N 8°17′54″W

Administration
- Ireland
- County: County Cork

Demographics
- Ethnic groups: Irish

Fota (historic and statutory spelling Foaty; Irish: Fóite) is an island in Cork Harbour, County Cork, Ireland, just north of the larger island of Great Island. It is the home of Fota Wildlife Park, the historical Fota House and Gardens, and the Fota Island Golf Club and Resort. The island comprises two townlands, both called Foaty; one is located in the civil parish of Clonmel (the western half of Great Island) and the other in Carrigtohill civil parish (on the mainland).

== Name ==
Although Foaty is the spelling fixed in the nineteenth century by the Ordnance Survey of Ireland, Fota is now more common. The origin of the name is uncertain. It may be of Hiberno-Norse origin, with second element Old Norse oy "island"; Donnchadh Ó Corráin suggests fódr oy "foot island", from its position at the mouth of the River Lee down from Cork city; some medieval references have an -r- in the name. Ó Corráin is sceptical of proposed Gaelic etymologies, fód thige "sod house", fodh teith "warm sod", and feóidhte "decayed/withered".

== Fota House and Gardens ==
=== Fota House ===
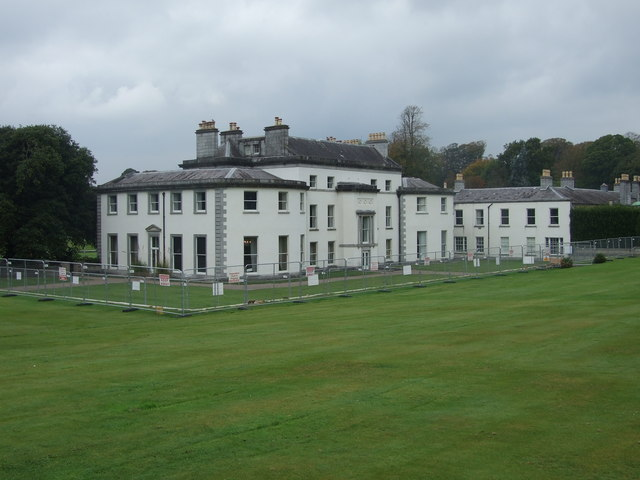
View of Fota House.

Fota House was the former home of the Smith-Barry family (Earls of Barrymore since 1627), descendants of Philip de Barry. The de Barry family came from Wales as part of the Norman invasion of Ireland. The family were granted lands at Fota and elsewhere in 1185.

The last member of the Smith-Barry family to live in Fota House was Dorothy Bell (1894–1975), daughter of Arthur Smith-Barry, 1st Baron Barrymore (1843–1925). She continued to develop and record the plant collections in the gardens and in the arboretum, which her family had started in the 1840s. On Bell's death in 1975, the estate was sold to University College, Cork.

During the latter part of the 20th century, the house fell into some disrepair – culminating in the collapse of a ceiling. This closed the house to the public for some time. It was restored using EU, Irish government and private funding, prior to reopening in early 2002. In December 2007, the new Irish Heritage Trust took over responsibility for Fota House.

=== Fota Gardens ===
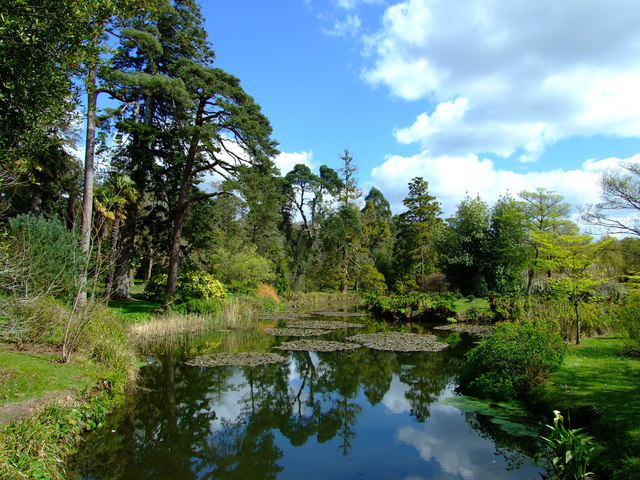
View of Fota Gardens and Arboretum.

Fota Gardens are in the grounds of Fota House. These consist of a structured arboretum, walled garden and terraces. The gardens include rare and exotic shrubs and trees, along with an extensive rose garden.

The layout and structure of the arboretum and gardens date largely from the tenure of the Smith-Barry family. Some of these rare plants found their way to Fota within a few years of their discovery.

In 1996 the Irish state was given control of the arboretum and gardens which had fallen into disrepair due to funding issues. Since 2007 they are administered by the Office of Public Works in conjunction with the Irish Heritage Trust. Restorations subsequently undertaken included the reopening of the Victorian working garden and several greenhouses.

== Fota Island Resort ==
Fota Island Resort lies within a 780-acre estate (originally the Fota House demesne) comprising woodlands and landscaped areas. Its golf course consisted of three par 71 championship courses. These courses were named Deerpark (Par 71), Belvelly (Par 72) and Barryscourt (Par 73).

The golf resort has hosted a number of tournaments, including the Irish Club Professional Championship, 2011 PGA Europro "Audi Cork Irish Masters", and the Irish Open in 2001, 2002 and 2014.

In 2004 the resort was purchased by the Killeen Group (owners of Mount Juliet Golf & Spa Hotel in Kilkenny), who invested to bring facilities in-line with European Tour standards. In November 2004, Killeen sold the club to the Fleming Group. In 2006, the Fleming Group completed construction of the 5-star Fota Island Hotel & Spa as well self-catering accommodation.

On 27 September 2013, Fota Island Resort management announced a handover to new owners, the Kang Family Worldwide Group. The Kang family, originally from Hebei Province in China, acquired the 500-acre resort from the National Asset Management Agency (NAMA).

== Fota Wildlife Park ==
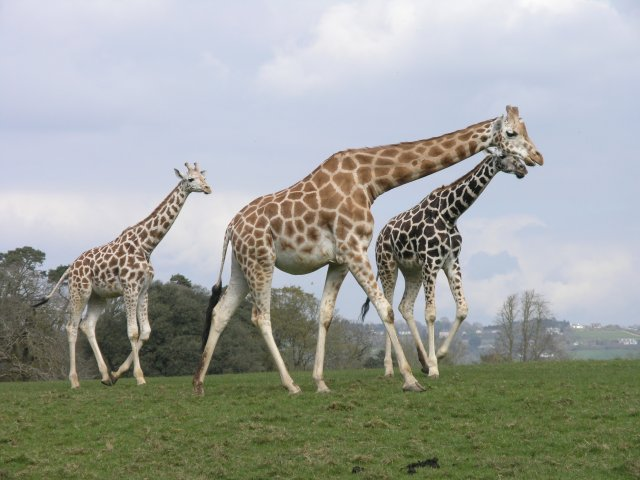
Giraffes at Fota Wildlife Park

Opened in July 1983 by the President of Ireland, Dr Patrick Hillery, Fota Wildlife Park has the primary aim of conservation of global wildlife. It is a joint project of the Zoological Society of Ireland and University College, Cork.

Fota Wildlife Park has more than 70 species of exotic wildlife in open surroundings. Animals include ostriches, giraffes, kangaroos, zebras and antelope. Most of the animals who inhabit the island are allowed to roam throughout more than 202,000 square metres (50 acres) of mature grassland, with the exception of the cheetahs and other predators, which have fenced enclosures. Ring-tailed lemurs, wallabies and other animals freely roam the park.

Many of the animals at Fota are under threat of extinction, and Fota Wildlife Park is involved in breeding programs for these endangered species, as well as being a breeding source for other zoos around the world. An Asian sanctuary opened between in 2015, and includes enclosures for tigers and other animals. In 2017 the park was the eleventh most popular paid attraction in Ireland, with 455,559 visitors that year.

== Transport ==
By rail, the island is served by Fota railway station, which opened on 1 July 1865.

By road, Fota lies just south of the N25 road from Cork to Rosslare. It is directly accessible via Cobh and Carrigtwohill on the R624 regional road - which runs from Tullagreen (N25 Southside Carrigtwohill-Cobh interchange) to Cobh town centre.
