= Rushbrooke halt =

Train station in Ireland

Rushbrooke
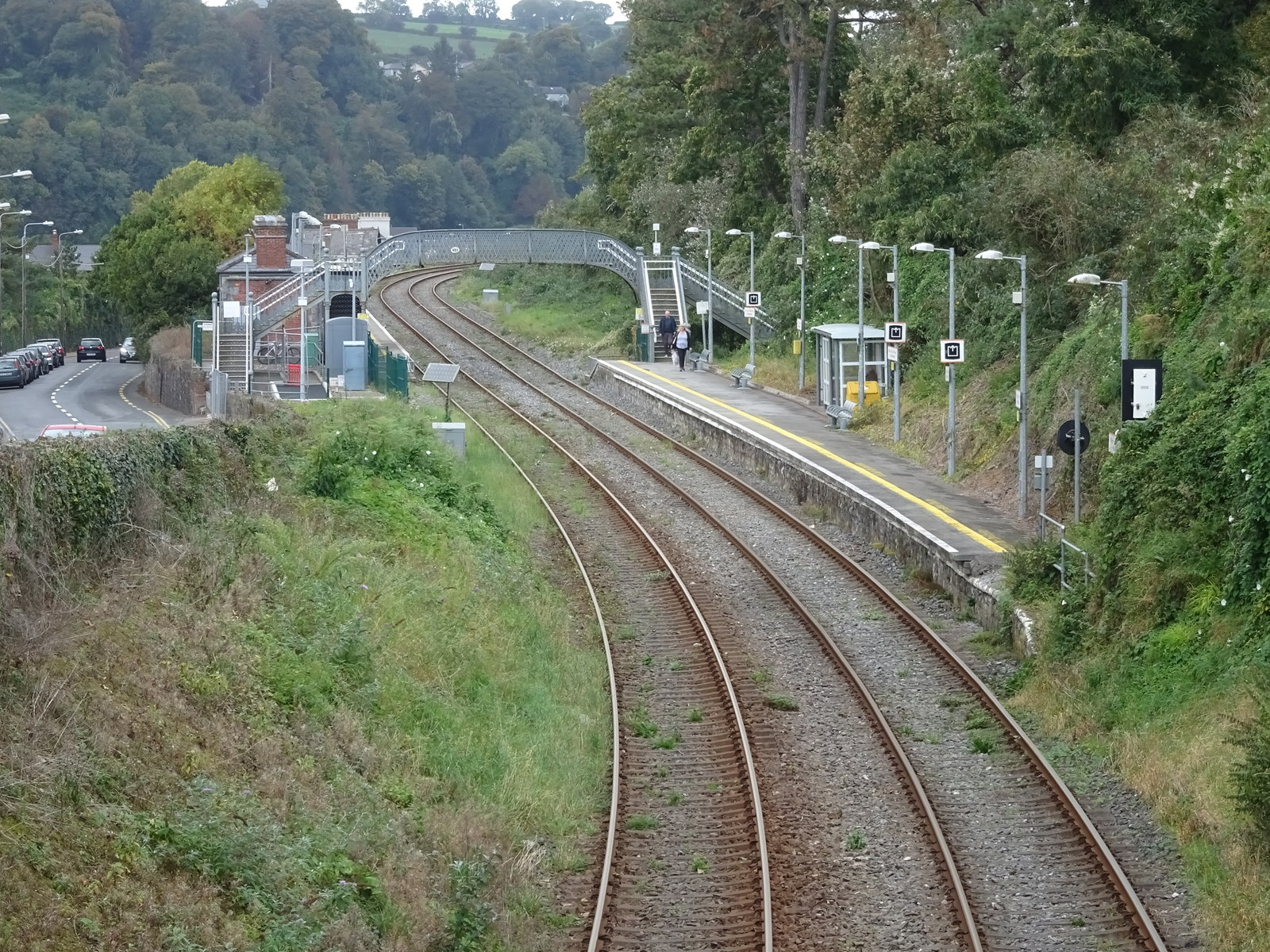
- Rushbrooke, looking northwest towards Carrigaloe

General information
- Location: Rushbrooke; Ireland
- Coordinates: 51°50′58″N 8°19′20″W
- Owner: Iarnród Éireann
- Platforms: 2

Construction
- Structure type: At-grade

History
- Opened: 10 March 1862

Services
Preceding station	Iarnród Éireann	Following station
Carrigaloe towards Cork Kent	Commuter Cork–Cobh	Cobh Terminus
Route map
Location

Rushbrooke is a train station in the Rushbrooke area, on Great Island in Cork harbour.

It is a station on the Cork to Cobh commuter service. Passengers transfer at Glounthaune station to travel to Midleton.

== Description ==
The station is unstaffed. Access is via a ramp to the Cork-bound platform but via stairs only to the Cobh-bound platform.

== History ==
The station opened on 10 March 1862 and closed for goods traffic on 2 December 1974.

== See also ==
- Cork Suburban Rail
- Metropolitan Cork
