= Cobh railway station =

Train station in Ireland

Cobh An Cóbh
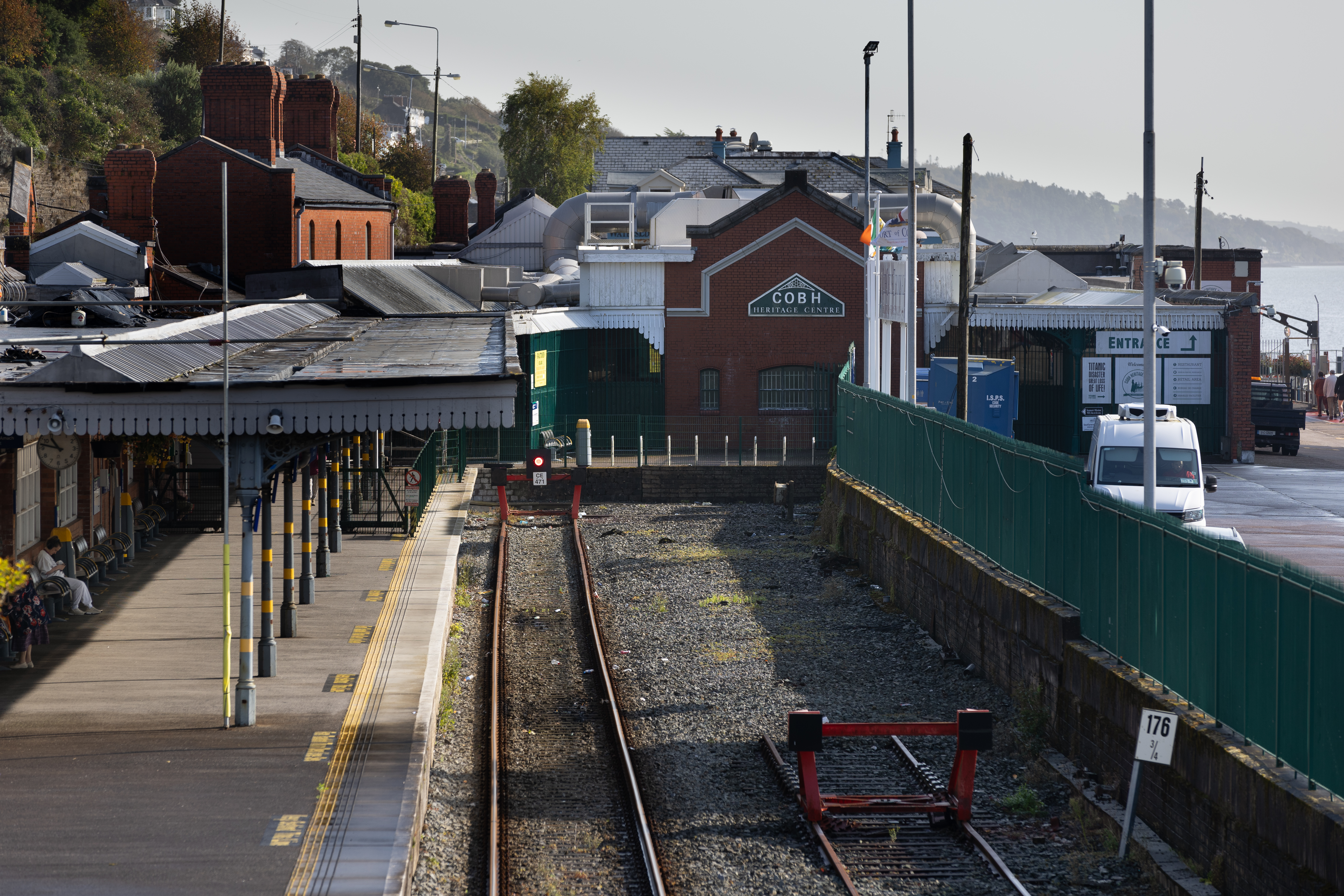

General information
- Location: Cobh; Ireland
- Coordinates: 51.848688°N 8.300944°W
- Owner: Iarnród Éireann
- Platforms: 1
- Bus operators: Barrys Coaches
- Connections: 250

Construction
- Structure type: At-grade

Services
| Preceding station | Iarnród Éireann | Following station |
|---|---|---|
| Rushbrooke towards Cork Kent | Commuter Cork–Cobh | Terminus |
Route map
Location

Cobh railway station serves the town of Cobh, County Cork. It is located in a red brick building adjacent to the town's Cobh Heritage Centre.

It is the terminus of the on Cork–Cobh section of the Cork Suburban Rail line. Travel to Glounthaune station to transfer to Midleton.

== Description ==
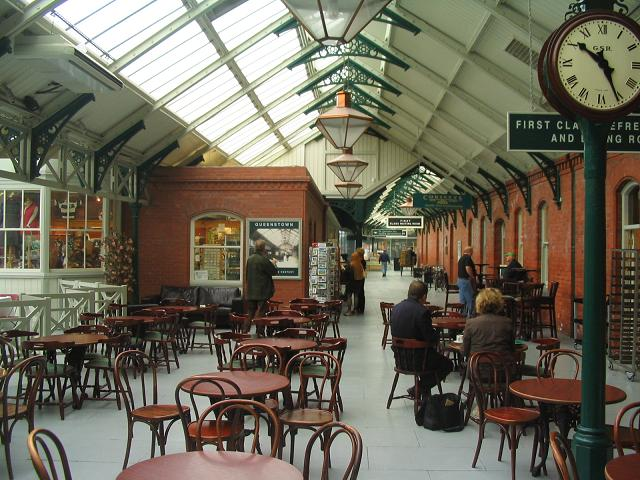
Cobh Heritage Centre, once the lobby of the town's railway station

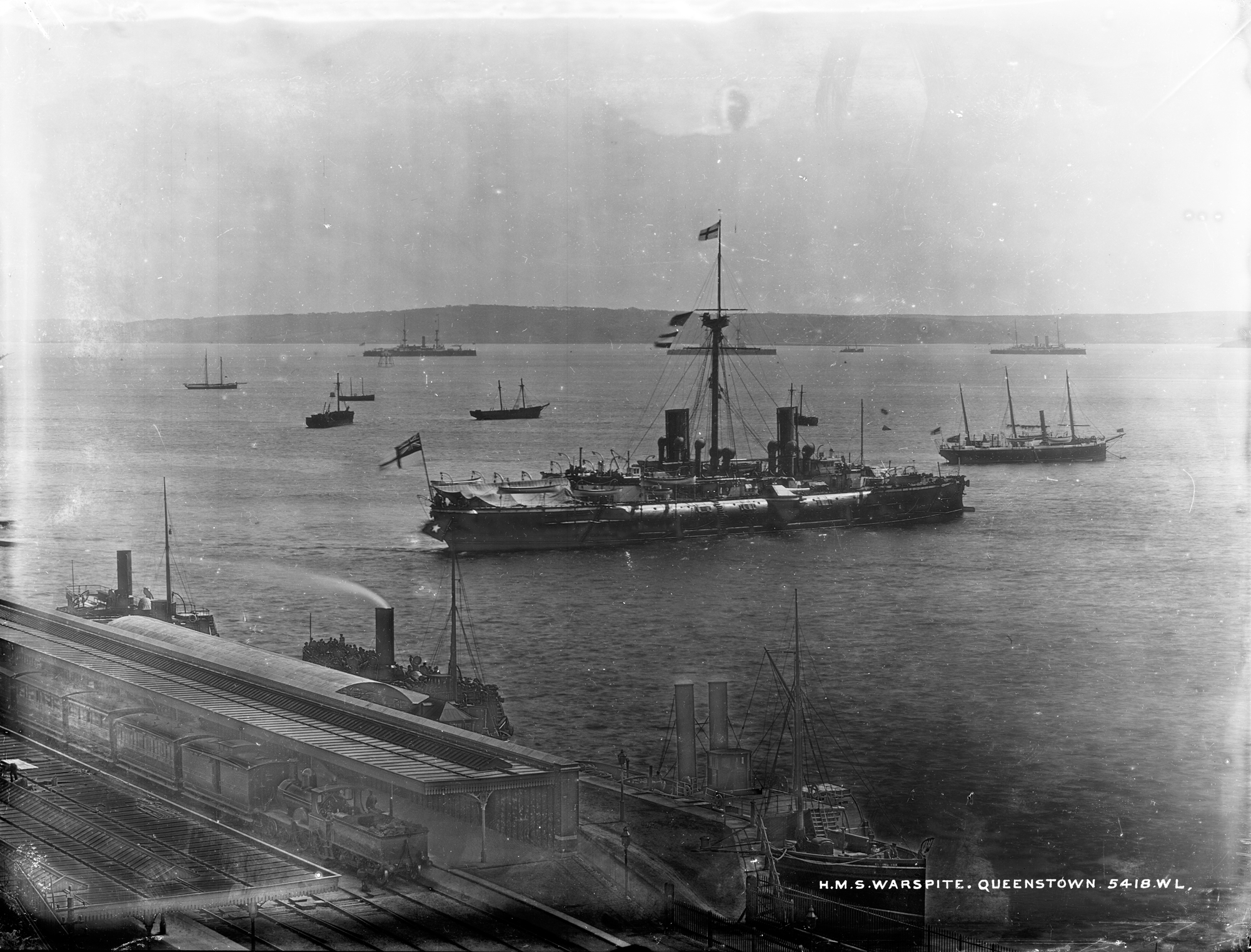
HMS Warspite at Queenstown in the 1890s

The station is staffed part-time and has a single platform. The station is accessible only via a steep ramp.

== History ==
The station opened 10 March 1862 and was closed for goods traffic on 3 November 1975.

It began life as the terminus of the Cobh (then Queenstown) section of the Cork, Youghal & Queenstown Railway.

The present station occupies only a small part of the old station building. The original station was expanded greatly during the latter part of the 19th century as it served what was then Ireland's largest emigration port which was also an important way-point as the last port between Western Europe and North America. The station was also the main receiving centre for mails for Ireland and Britain from the United States and Canada. Mail would be brought by ship to Cobh, processed and forwarded by mail express trains to Kingstown (now Dún Laoghaire) on the outskirts of Dublin and on to Holyhead. This was faster than conveying by ship directly to Liverpool.

It is famous for being the station where hundreds of survivors of the RMS Lusitania disaster left the town of Cobh after surviving the sinking.

With the development and growth of transatlantic air traffic Cobh lost its importance as a mail and passenger centre. A significant part of the train station remained largely unused until the opening of the Cobh Heritage Centre in the front part of the station in the 1980s. At that time the station was also reduced to a single platform. The freight yard of the station has now become a public carpark while another part of the station has become a covered carpark for Cobh Garda Station.

== See also ==
- List of railway stations in Ireland
- Metropolitan Cork
- Cork Suburban Rail
