= Izz =

Izz may refer to:

- Ibn Abi al-Izz (fl. 14th century), Islamic scholar
- IZZ, New York-based progressive rock band
- Izi language (ISO 639: izz), Igboid language of Nigeria
- Izz al-Dawla (died 978), emir of Iraq
- Izz al-Din, Arabic masculine given name and surname
- Izz Cafe, Palestinian restaurant in Cork, Ireland
