= Wilton, Cork =

Suburb of Cork city, Ireland

Wilton
- Suburb
- Location in Cork
- Coordinates: 51°52′48″N 8°30′29″W
- Country: Ireland
- Province: Munster
- Administrative area: Cork (city)

Population (2011)
  - Total: 1,435
- Time zone: UTC+0 (WET)
  - Summer (DST): UTC-1 (IST (WEST))

Wilton is a suburb of Cork city, Ireland. It is the site of Cork University Hospital, Cork's largest hospital. Other landmarks include Wilton Shopping Centre and St. Finbarr's Cemetery, which lies on the border between Wilton and Glasheen and is the resting place of some of Cork's most notable citizens.

== Amenities ==
Wilton Shopping Centre has a number of stores (including Tesco, Penneys, and New Look), with Aldi and Lidl stores also in the area. St Joseph's Catholic Church (S.M.A. Wilton) is located close to the shopping centre.

Local association football clubs include Wilton United.

== Infrastructure ==
The Sarfield Road Roundabout in Wilton underwent redevelopment in 2012, to reduce traffic volume in the Wilton area, and improve access to Cork University Hospital from the N40 road.

In July 2016 there was some question as to the accuracy of road signage indicating the boundary between Wilton and Togher.
