= Marina Market =

Food hall and multipurpose venue in Cork, Ireland

- Interactive map of Marina Market
- Address: Centre Park Road, T12YX76; Cork; Ireland
- Coordinates: 51°53′56″N 8°27′7″W
- Owner: Urban Green Private
- Operator: Anschutz Entertainment Group
- Type: Former warehouse
- Events: Food market; Music venue

Construction
- Opened: September 2020

Tenants
- 30 food vendors and 5 retail vendors as of 2023

Website
- https://www.marinamarket.ie/

The Marina Market is an indoor food hall and multipurpose venue near the centre of Cork, Ireland. Formerly a warehouse, it was converted and then opened to the public in September 2020 during the COVID-19 pandemic to offer food services to the community in an open-air space. Its popularity saw it continue to operate after the pandemic subsided. In 2023, formal planning permission was secured by its operators, who intend it to become a permanent venue.

== Function ==
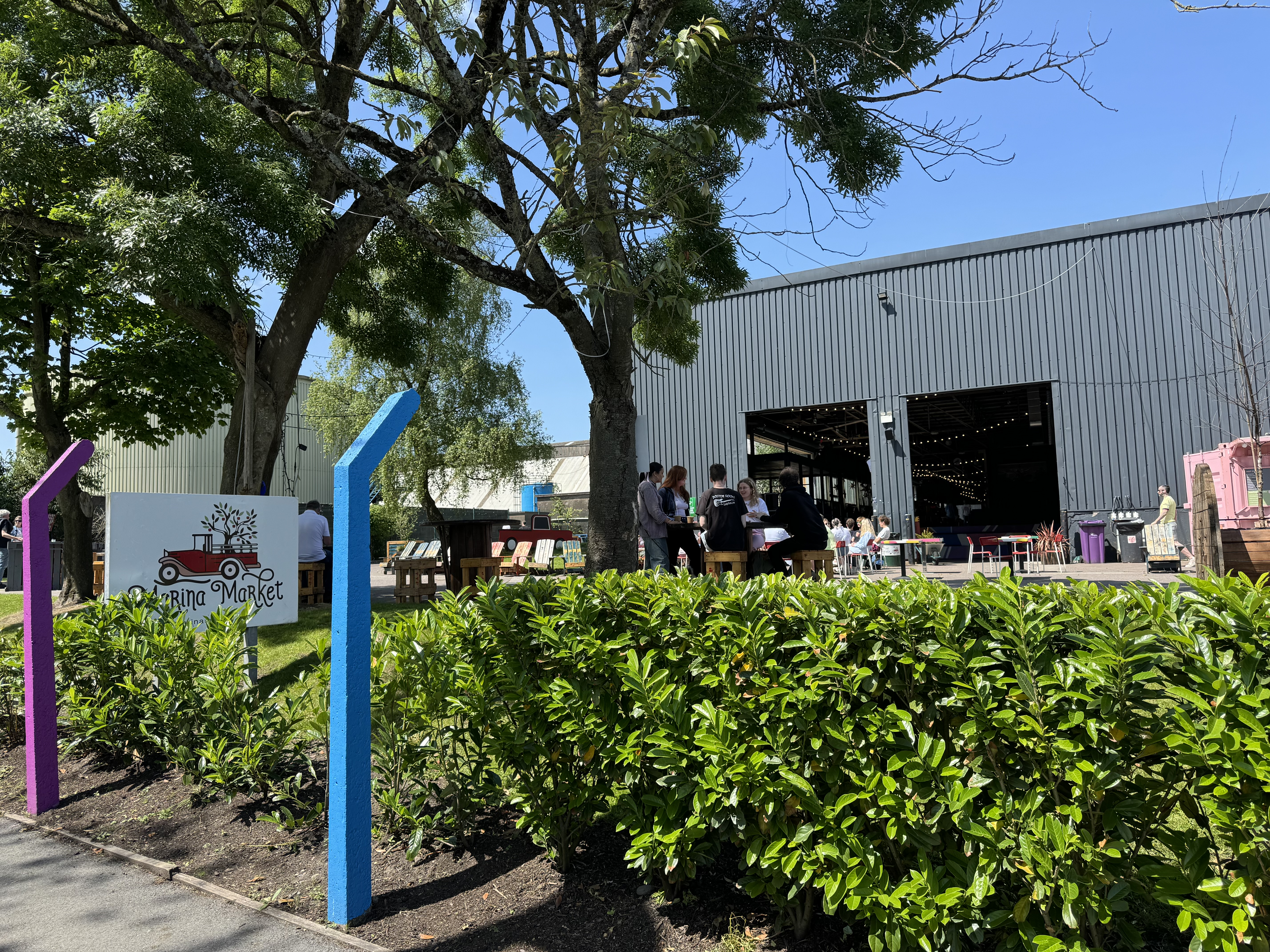
Marina Market entrance, from the Centre Park Road, in 2024

As of 2023, the venue is home to 30 food vendors and 5 retail vendors. A number of worldwide cuisines and street food varieties are sold, including Korean, Soul food, Venezuelan, Brazilian, Italian and Middle Eastern in addition to more traditional local fast food, coffee and pastries. A number of the food stalls at Marina Market serve as outposts for restaurants elsewhere in the city. Amongst the retail vendors is an on-site barbers.

Besides its primary purpose as an indoor food marketplace, the building has also served as a music venue, an events venue, a cinema, a roller rink and an ice rink.

== History ==
The Marina Market opened in September 2020 amidst the COVID-19 pandemic; As businesses sought open-air venues to work out of in order to continue operations, the site of the Southern Fruits Distribution Company warehouse at Centre Park Road was investigated. Urban Green Private, a property development firm created by developer Tom Coughlan in 2013, took control of the site and converted it from a warehouse into an indoor marketplace and venue. The group did so without first securing planning permission. The first vendor to establish itself at the venue was Guji coffee, which operated out of a freight container painted pink.

In November 2022, planning permission was sought for the first time to retroactively cover the venue, however, it was rejected by Cork City Council. The council suggested that the venue did not have the infrastructure required to support the foot, bicycle and car traffic being drawn towards it. The council also noted the site's proximity to Gouldings Chemicals compound, which raised health concerns. The decision proved controversial and, almost immediately, 20,000 people signed a petition asking the council to reconsider. Additionally, a number of local politicians and journalists voiced their support for the venue, with former Mayor of Cork Mick Finn stating that "the "Marina Market is a fantastic, multi-purpose facility that is already iconic in Cork. Hundreds are employed there" while Catherine Conlon of the Irish Examiner called Marina Market "one of the best things that emerged in Cork City post-pandemic" and argued that it was one of the most important third places in Cork.

In September 2023, a second proposal was granted planning permission by the council, with the Health and Safety Authority stating that it had no objections to the development. With the second proposal, came several million euros of planned investment in the venue. Upon securing the planning permission, a spokesperson for the ownership group stated they would seek to make Marina Market an urban market "on par with any major European city".

In April 2025, conceptual development plans for a cultural and commercial hub at the Marina Market were released by Níall McLaughlin Architects and the market's operators AEG. The proposed plan included a covered street food market with upgraded infrastructure, an events centre with capacity for over 4,000 people, a 100-bed hotel, and a contemporary art gallery. As of April 2025, a planning application had not been submitted.

== See also ==
- The Black Market, Cork - Alternative food market in Cork
- The English Market - Historic food market also in Cork
- The Milk Market - Food market found in Limerick
- The Iveagh Markets - Former market in Dublin
