= Ballyvolane, Cork =

Suburb of Cork, Ireland

Ballyvolane Baile Uí Mhaoláin
- Suburb
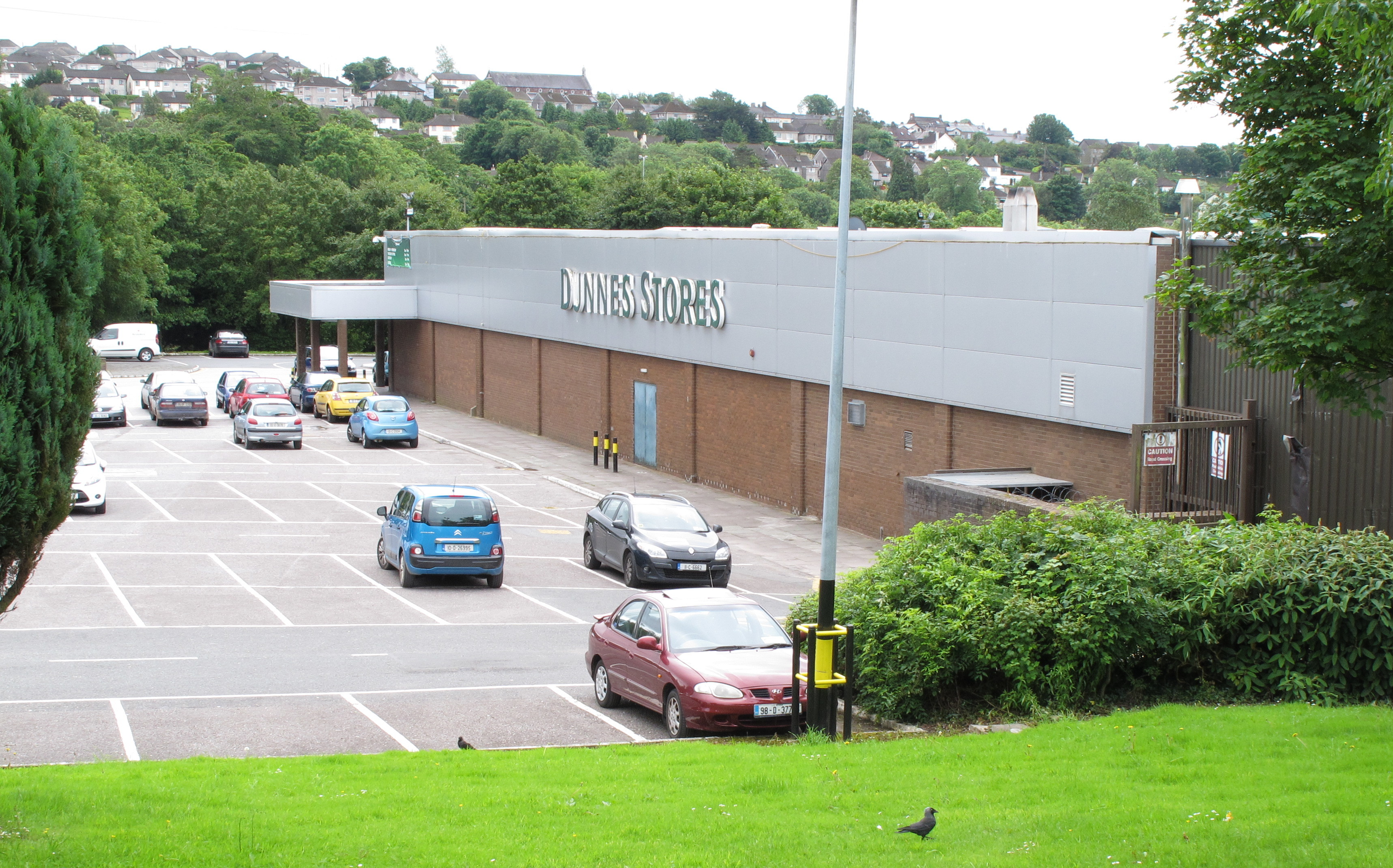
- Shopping centre in Ballyvolane

- Location in Ireland
- Coordinates: 51°55′01″N 8°26′49″W
- Country: Ireland
- Province: Munster
- Administrative area: Cork (city)
- Irish Grid Reference: W692739

Ballyvolane (Irish: Baile Uí Mhaoláin) is a townland and suburb of Cork on the north side of the city. The townland of Ballyvolane is in the civil parish of St. Anne's Shandon. It is within the Cork North-Central Dáil constituency.

The two schools in Ballyvolane are St. Aidan's Community Community College and Scoil Oilibhéir, and the local Roman Catholic Church is Saint Oliver's, built in the 1990s. Nearby archaeological sites, protected under the National Monuments Acts, include a number of burnt mounds and fulacht fiadh.

Ballyvolane Shopping Centre is anchored by Dunnes Stores and first opened in 1980.

In June 2012, several households in the area were damaged by flooding.

== See also ==
- Mayfield
