= The Black Market, Cork =

Food hall and multipurpose venue in Cork, Ireland

The Black Market
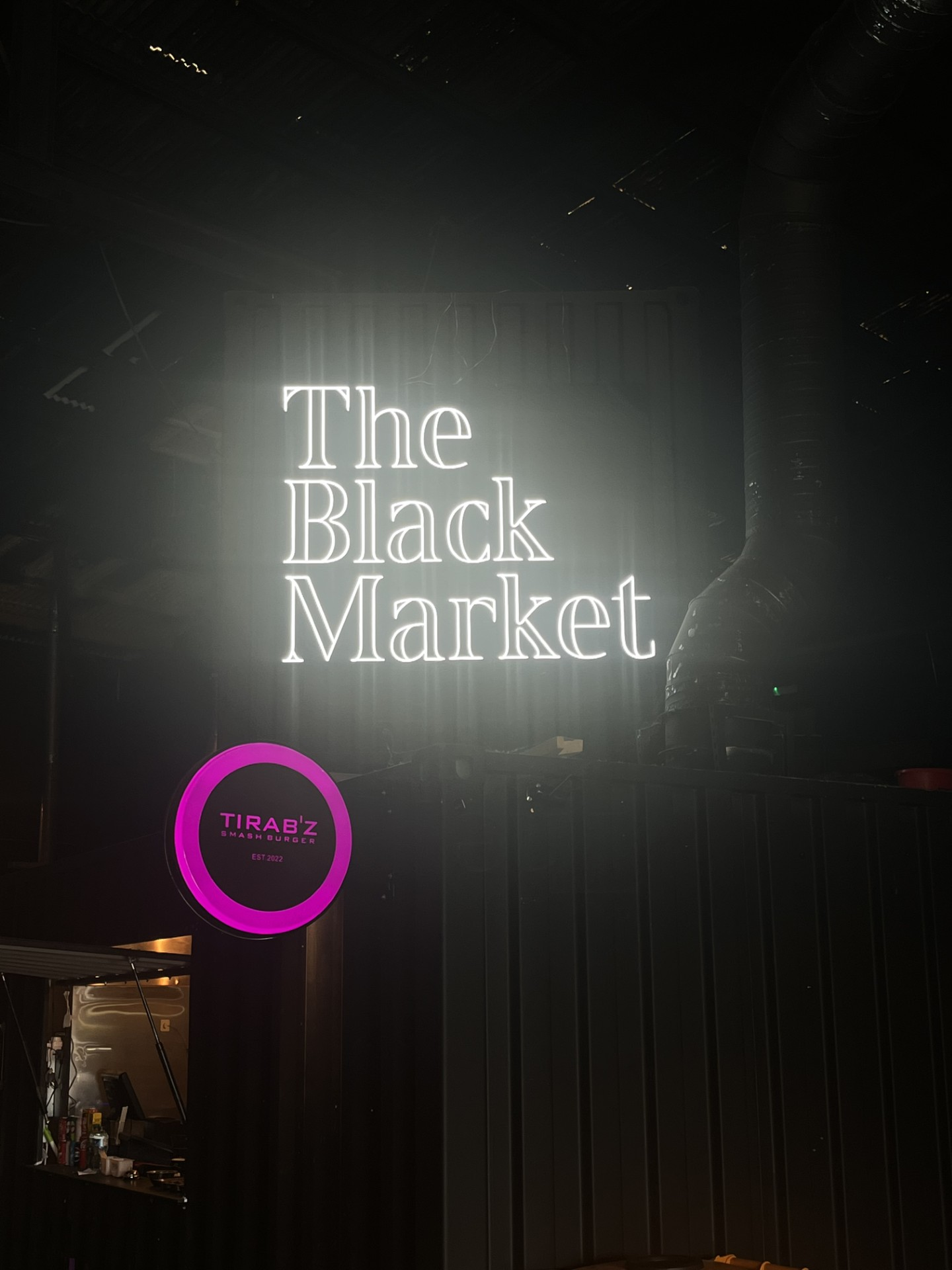
- Interactive map of The Black Market
- Address: Dornan's Yard, Monahan Rd, Ballintemple, Cork, T12 NXN1; Cork; Ireland
- Coordinates: 51°53′45″N 8°26′36″W
- Type: Former warehouse
- Events: Food market; Music venue

Construction
- Opened: September 2021
- Closed: c. 2026 (status unconfirmed)

Website
- www.theblackmarketcork.ie

The Black Market is an indoor food hall and multipurpose venue situated on Monahan Road, Ballintemple, in Cork City, Ireland. It is located in the same industrial area as Cork's Marina Market. The Black Market opened in September 2021, one year after the opening of the Marina Market, and occupies a relatively small space at the back of an industrial unit. Its name and identity derive from its aesthetic theme: nearly everything is painted matte black, including shipping containers, the roof, and furnishings. As of October 2026, the market is not trading, though it remains unclear whether its closure is permanent or temporary.

== Design and function ==
The market is built around repurposed shipping containers arranged in a U-shape around a central courtyard. These containers house food outlets and retail vendors. The interior features artificial grass, art murals and black décor. The design choice is noted to emphasise the location as an alternative to the more mainstream Marina Market.

In addition to serving as a food market, the Black Market also occasionally serves as a music venue. The venue operated Wednesday to Sunday.

== Vendors ==
As of 2025, the Black Market featured a number of food vendors including Brendan's Burritos, The Pie Guys (savoury pies), Taste of Home (Eastern European cuisine) and Tirab Smash Burger (burgers and spicy African-style chicken dishes). Other vendors include A&P Smoothie Bar and Soma Coffee roasts. By mid-2025, the market comprised nine vendors.

== Fire and closure (2026) ==
On 9 April 2026, a fire broke out at the Black Market shortly after 1pm. Three units of Cork City Fire Service responded from Anglesea Street headquarters, and patrons were evacuated while crews dealt with the blaze; Gardaí also attended the scene. The market was briefly closed as a result of the incident.

By July 2026, it emerged that the Black Market was operating without a fire safety certificate, which Cork City Council confirmed was required for the building as a whole, covering all uses within it. A council spokesperson said the local authority was engaging with the premises' owners regarding an application for the certificate, and warned that failure to apply could result in a fire safety inspection, advice, and ultimately enforcement action.

Some vendors were subsequently given notice by the market's operators to cease trading. Tirab Smash Burger was told to vacate the premises by 3 August 2026; its owner, Djamal Tirab, said he was seeking a new site for the business. Tongue Tied Deli, which also operated a food residency at Osho on Barrack Street, ceased trading at the Monahan Road site in late June 2026. The operators of the Black Market did not respond to media requests for comment at the time.

As of October 2026, the Black Market remains closed, with no confirmation from its operators as to whether trading will resume.
