= Cork (city) =

City in County Cork, Munster, Ireland

Cork Corcaigh (Irish)
- City
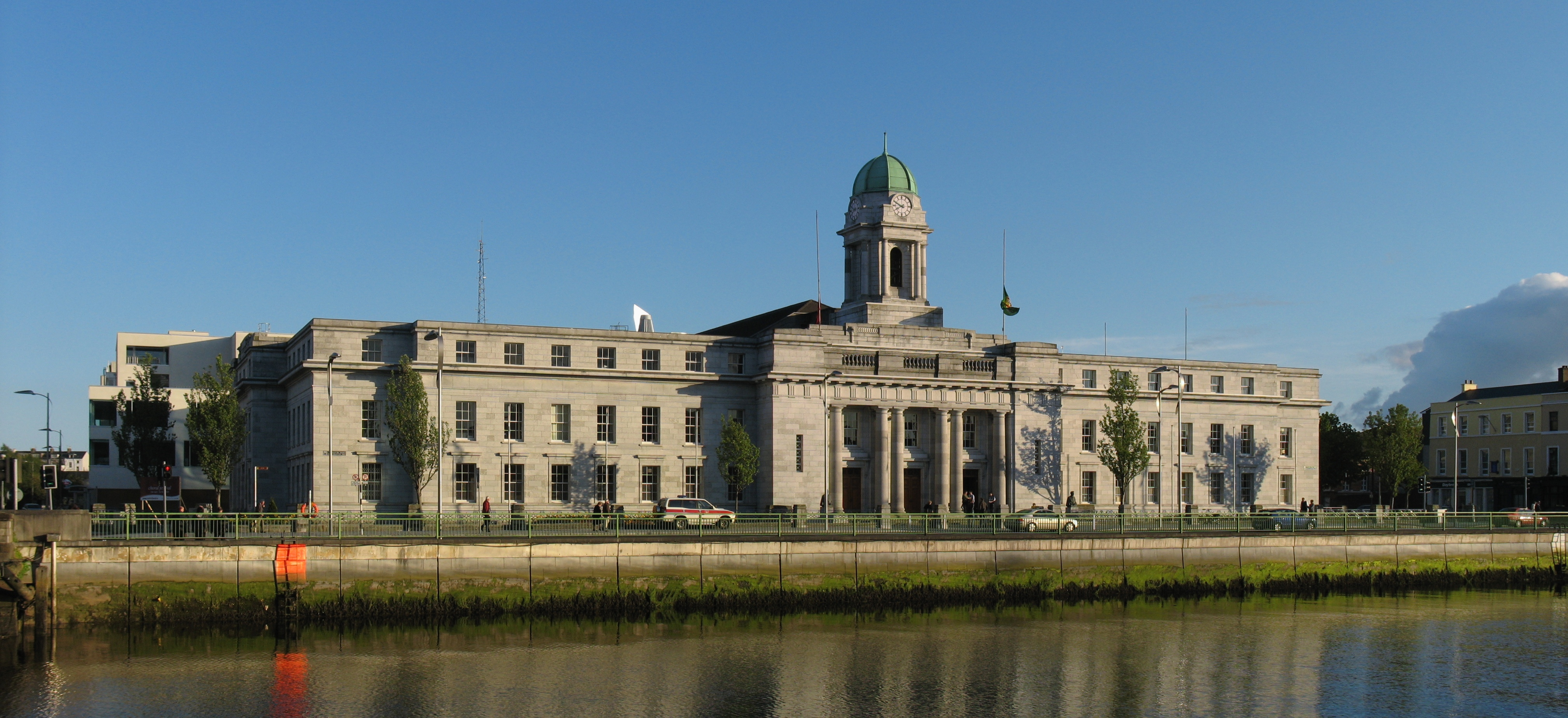
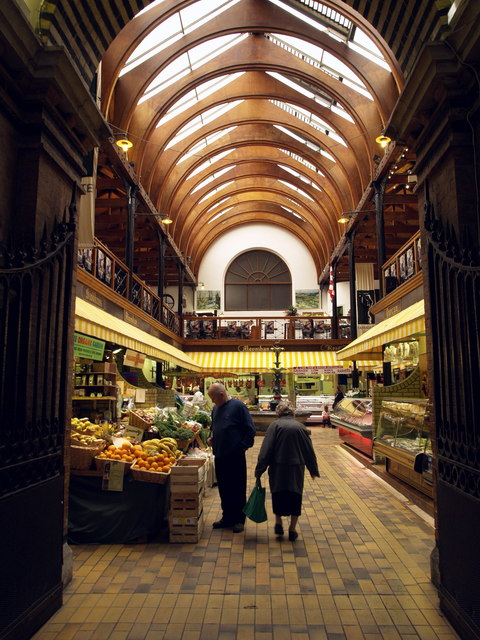
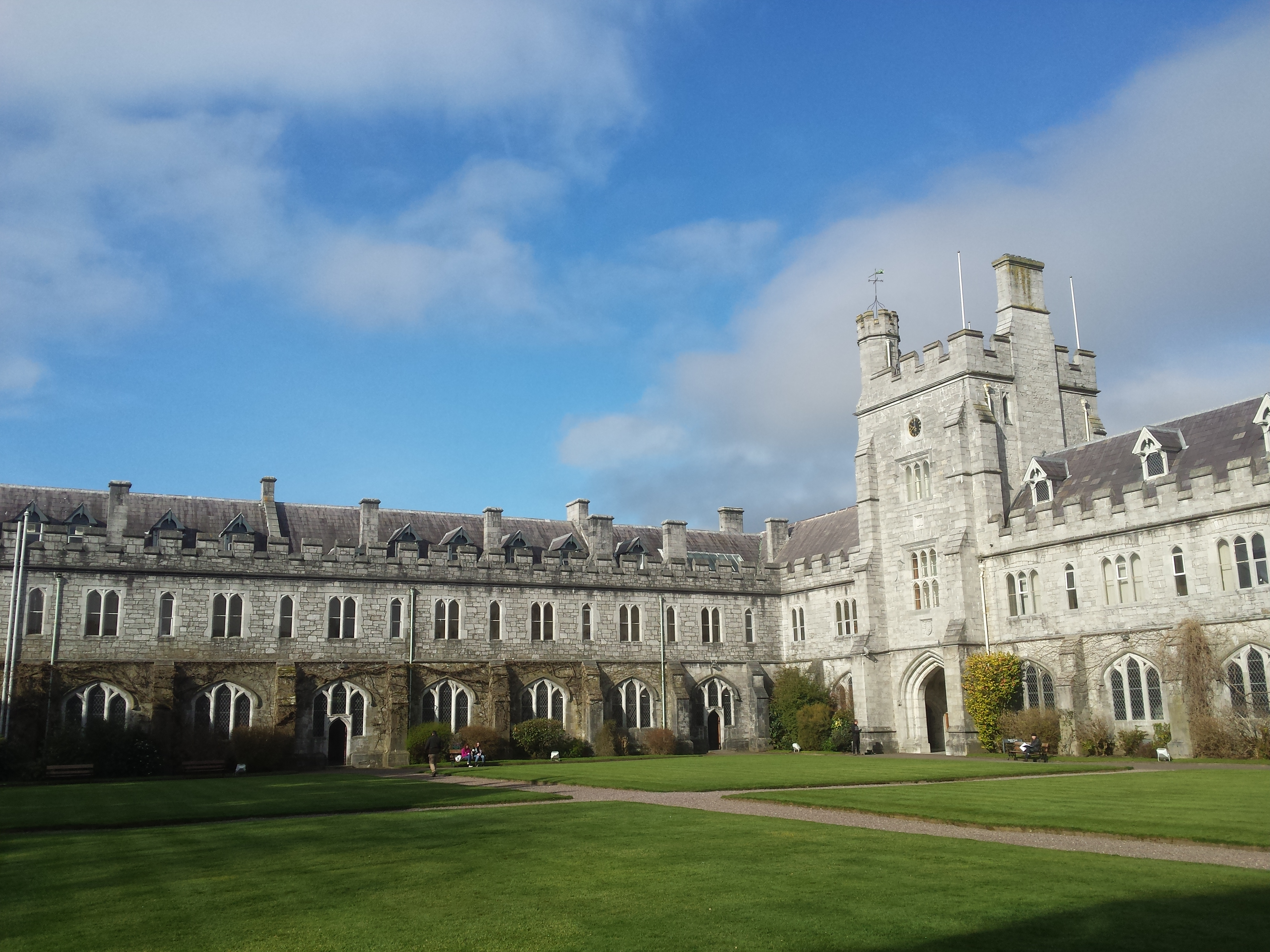
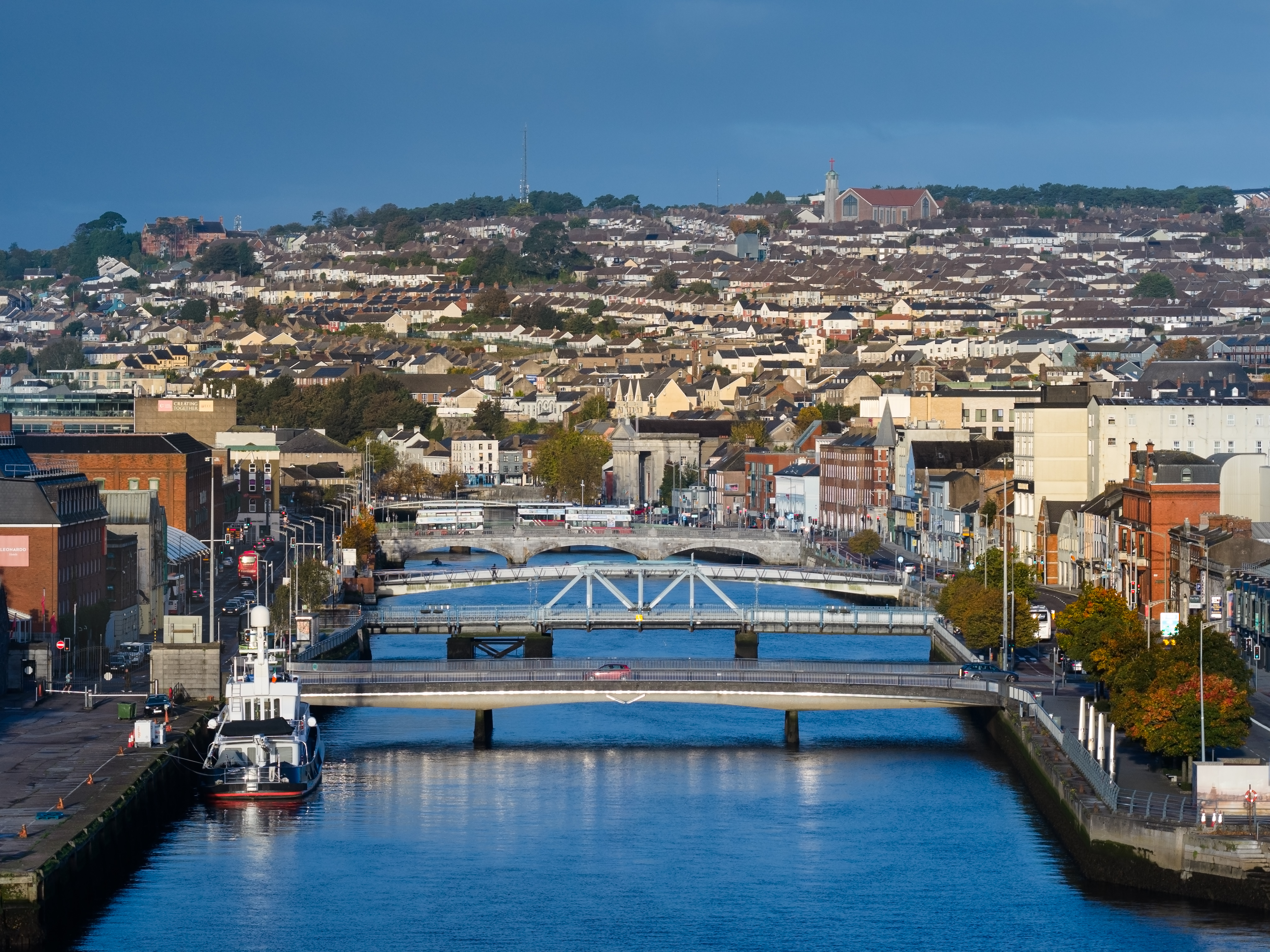
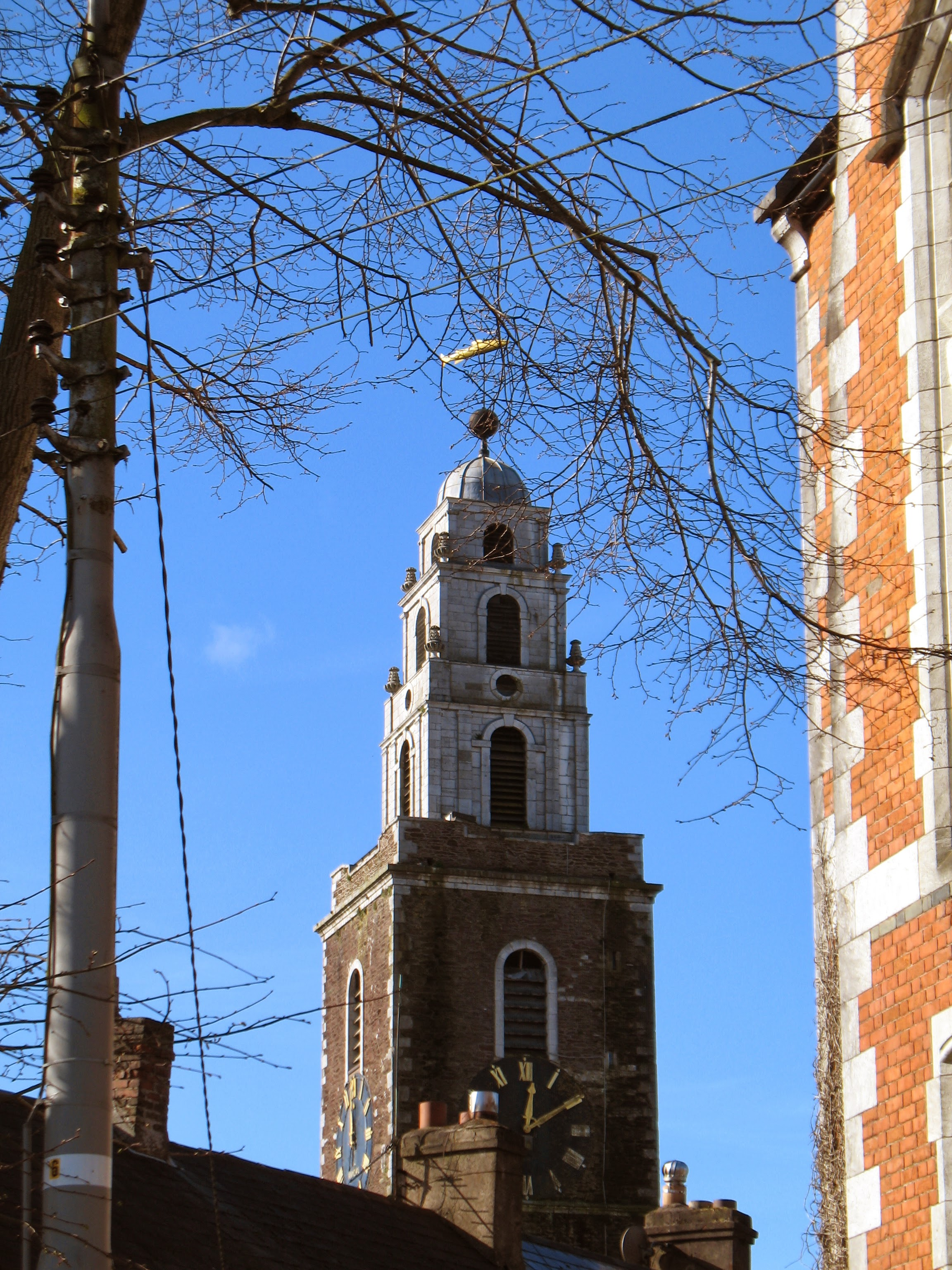
- Cork City Hall English Market Quadrangle in UCC River Lee Shandon Steeple

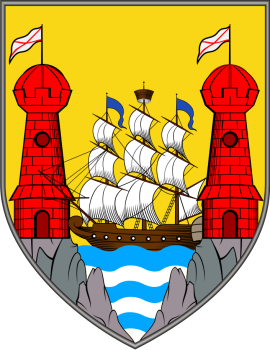
- Coat of arms
- Nicknames: The Rebel City, Leeside, The Real Capital
- Motto: Latin: Statio Bene Fida Carinis "A safe harbour for ships"
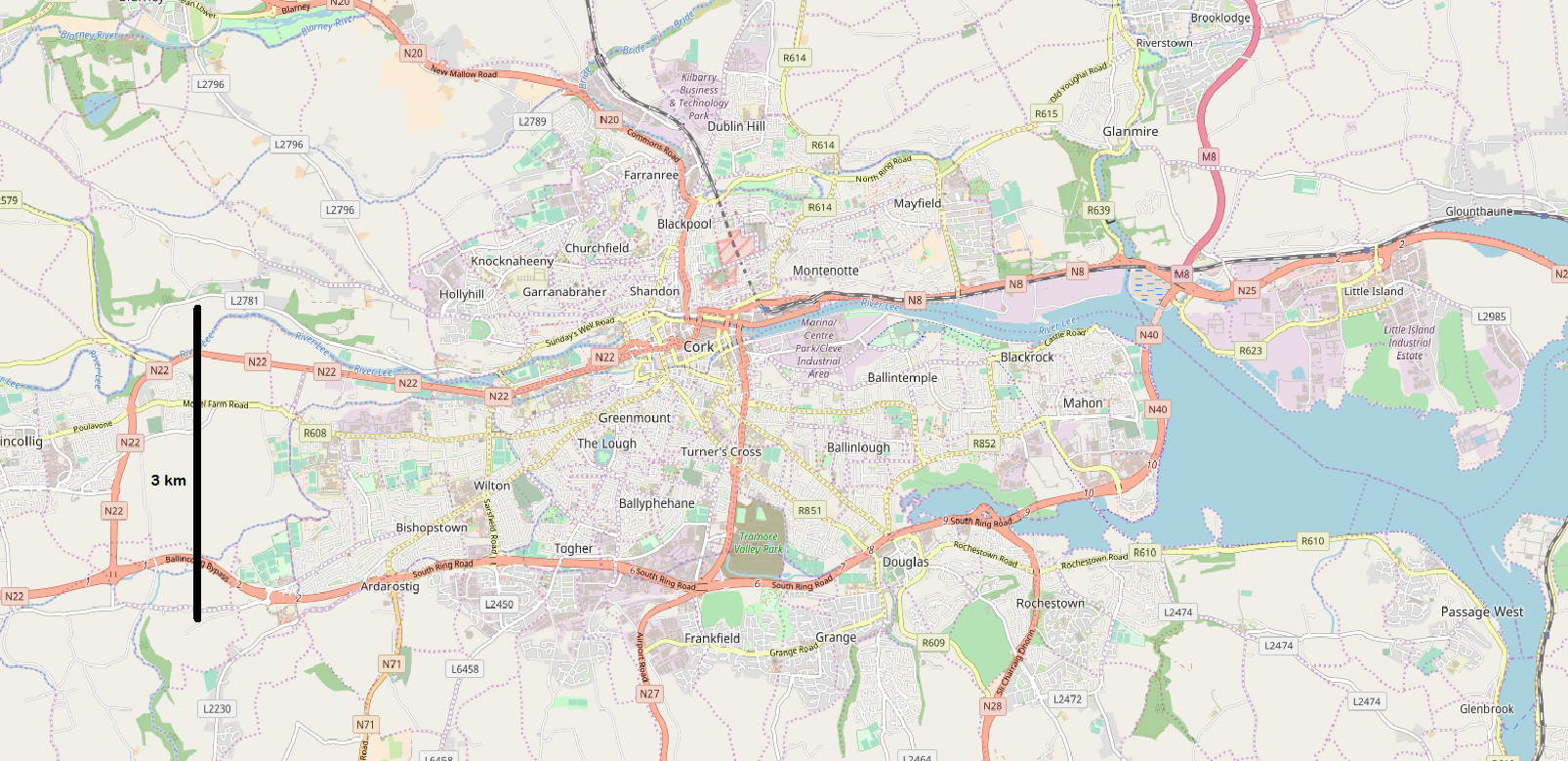
- Interactive map of Cork
- Location within Ireland Location within Europe
- Coordinates: 51°53′50″N 8°28′12″W
- State: Ireland
- Province: Munster
- Region: Southern
- County: County Cork
- Founded: 6th century
- City rights: 1185

Government
  - Local authority: Cork City Council
  - Lord Mayor: Damian Boylan (FG)
  - Local electoral areas: Cork City North West; Cork City North East; Cork City South Central; Cork City South East; Cork City South West
  - Dáil constituencies: Cork North-Central; Cork South-Central; Cork North-West
  - European Parliament: South

Area
  - City: 187 km^{2} (72 sq mi)
  - Urban: 174 km^{2} (67 sq mi)
  - Metro: 820 km^{2} (320 sq mi)

Population (2022)
  - City: 224,004
  - Density: 1,188/km^{2} (3,080/sq mi)
  - Metro (2022): 327,649
  - Demonym: Corkonian or Leesider
- Time zone: UTC0 (WET)
  - Summer (DST): UTC+1 (IST)
- Eircode: T12 and T23
- Area code: 021
- Vehicle index mark code: C
- Website: www.corkcity.ie

Cork (Irish: Corcaigh [ˈkɔɾˠkəɟ]; from corcach, meaning 'marsh') is the second-largest city in the Republic of Ireland, the county town of County Cork, the largest city in the province of Munster and the third-largest on the island of Ireland. At the 2022 census, it had a population of 224,004.

The city centre is an island between two channels of the River Lee which meet downstream at its eastern end, where the quays and docks along the river lead outwards towards Lough Mahon and Cork Harbour, one of the world's largest natural harbours.

Cork was founded in the 6th century as a monastic settlement, and was expanded by Viking invaders around 915. Its charter was granted by Prince John in 1185. Cork city was once fully walled, and remnants of the old medieval town centre remain around South and North Main streets. The city's cognomen of "the rebel city" originates in its support for the Yorkist cause in the Wars of the Roses. Corkonians sometimes refer to the city as "the real capital", a reference to its opposition to the Anglo-Irish Treaty in the Irish Civil War.

== History ==
Cork was originally a monastic settlement, reputedly founded by Saint Finbar in the sixth century. It became more urbanised between 915 and 922 when Norseman (Viking) settlers founded a trading port. Like Dublin, Cork was an important trading centre in the global Scandinavian trade network. The ecclesiastical settlement developed alongside the Viking longphort, with the two forming a type of symbiotic relationship; the Norsemen providing otherwise unobtainable trade goods for the monastery, and perhaps also military aid.

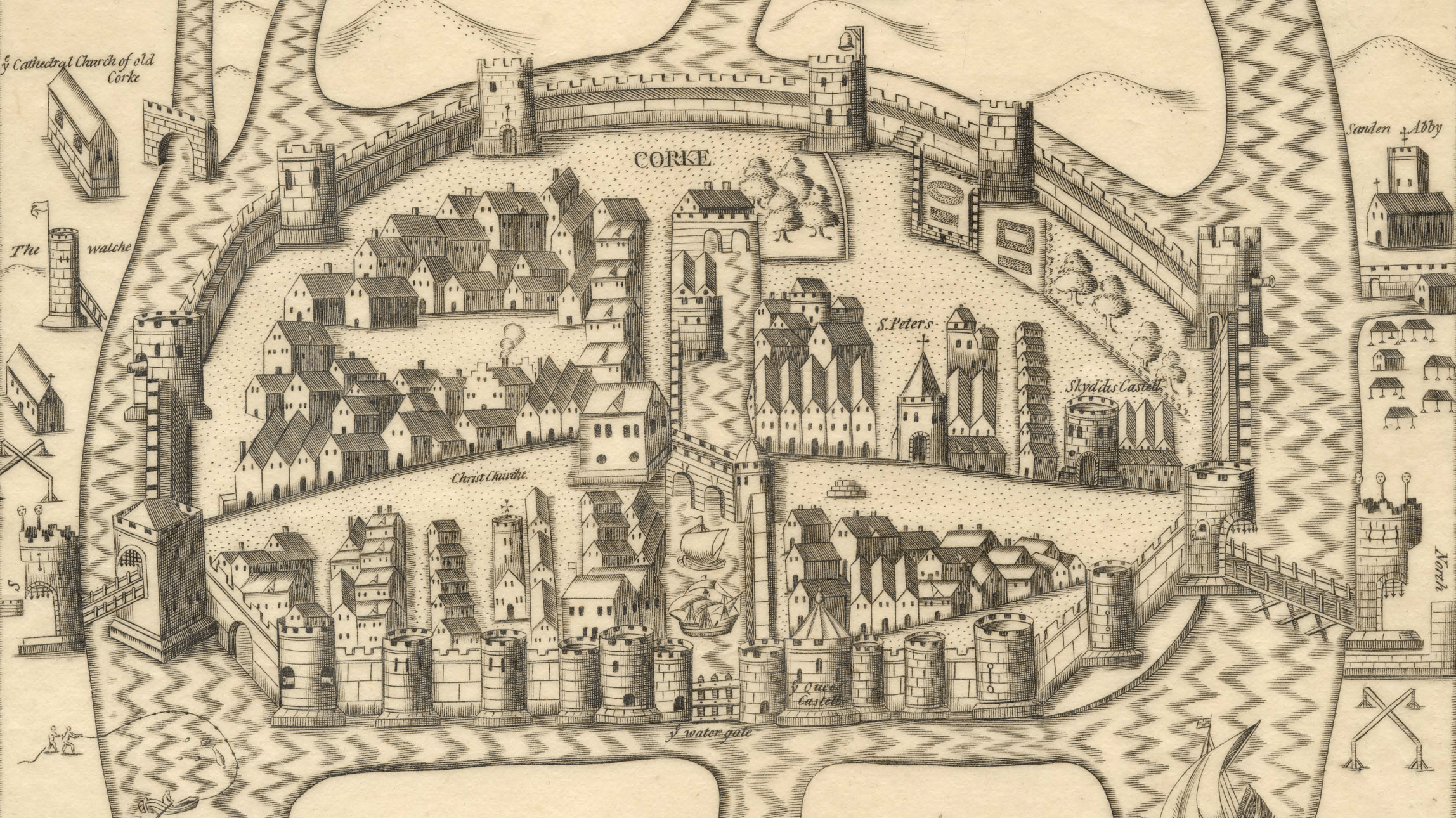
Map of 16th-century Cork

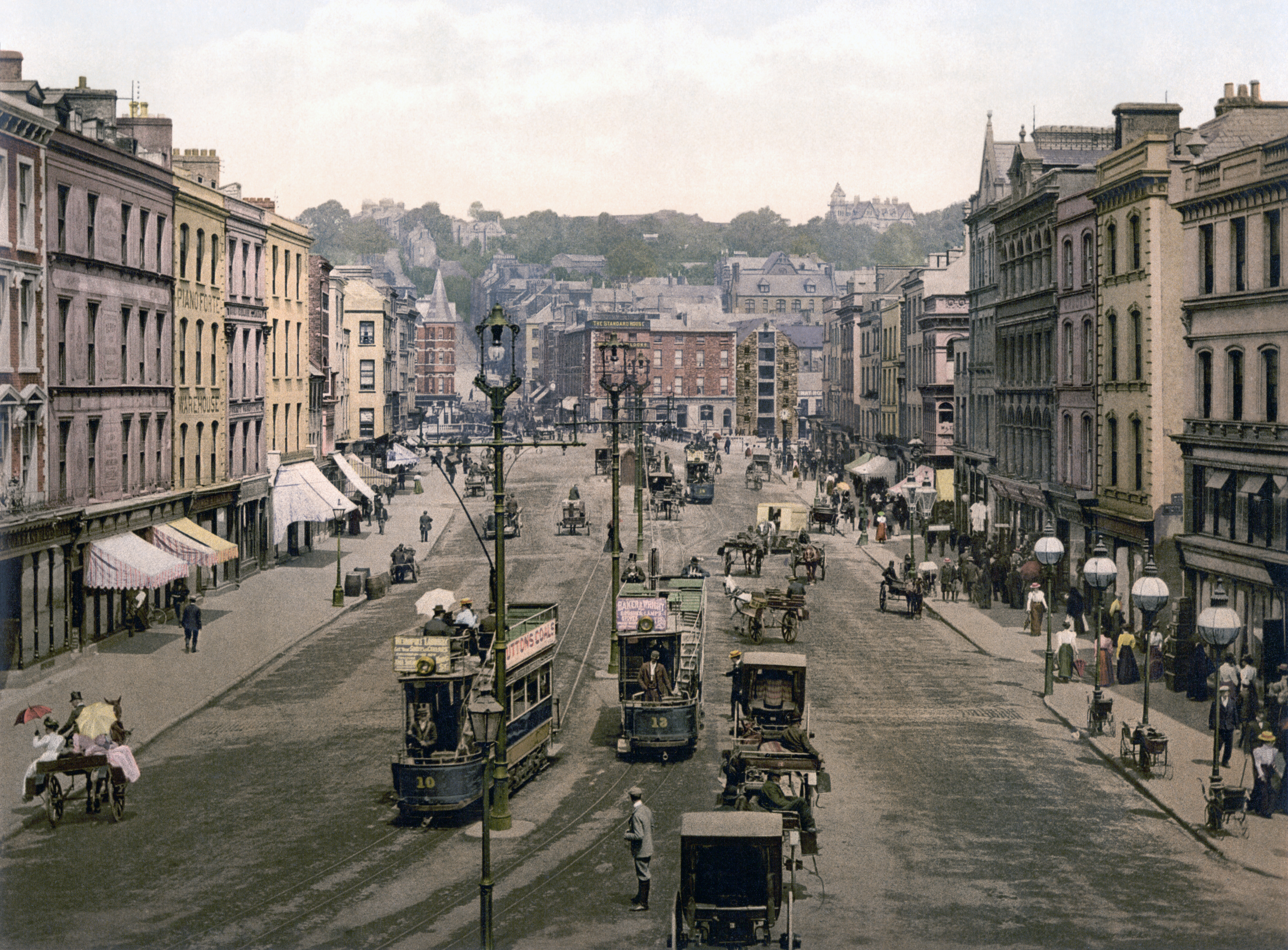
Patrick Street c. 1890–1900

The city's charter was granted by Prince John, as Lord of Ireland, in 1185. The city was once fully walled, and some wall sections and gates remain today. For much of the Middle Ages, Cork city was an outpost of Old English culture in the midst of a predominantly hostile Gaelic countryside and cut off from the English government in the Pale around Dublin. Neighbouring Gaelic and Hiberno-Norman lords extorted "Black Rent" from the citizens to keep them from attacking the city. The present extent of the city has exceeded the medieval boundaries of the Barony of Cork City; it now takes in much of the neighbouring Barony of Cork. Together, these baronies are located between the Barony of Barrymore to the east, Muskerry East to the west and Kerrycurrihy to the south.

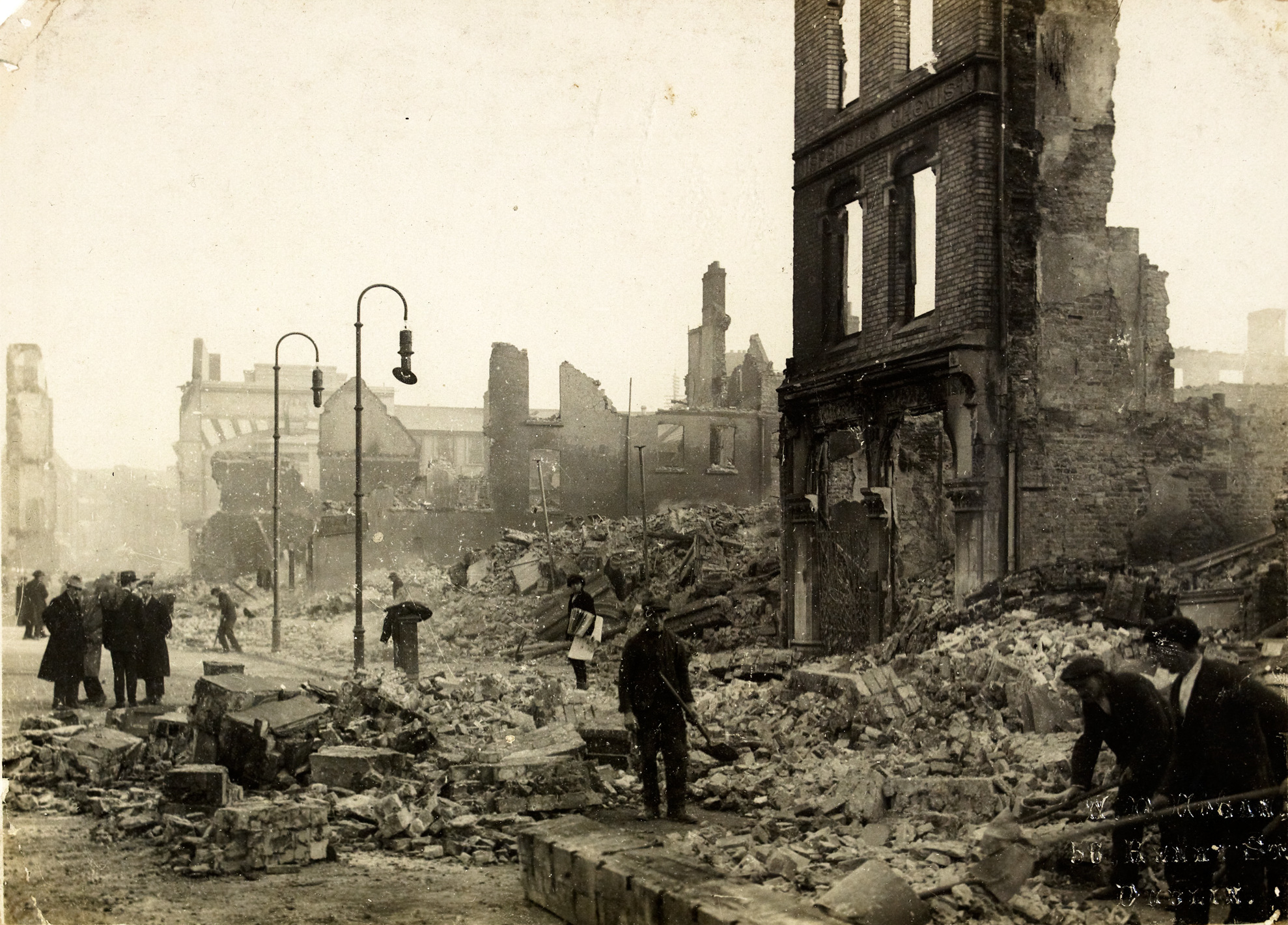
Workers clearing rubble on St Patrick's street following the Burning of Cork

The city's municipal government was dominated by about 12–15 merchant families, whose wealth came from overseas trade with continental Europe—in particular the export of wool and hides and the import of salt, iron and wine.

The medieval population of Cork was about 2,100 people. It suffered a severe blow in 1349 when almost half the townspeople died of plague when the Black Death arrived in the town. In 1491, Cork played a part in the English Wars of the Roses when Perkin Warbeck, a pretender to the English throne, landed in the city and tried to recruit support for a plot to overthrow Henry VII. The mayor of Cork and several important citizens went with Warbeck to England, but when the rebellion collapsed they were all captured and executed.

During the Williamite War in Ireland, the city was besieged in September 1690 leading to the surrender of its Jacobite garrison to the Earl of Marlborough.

In the 18th century Cork sustained its trade with Continental Europe, and was known for the export of wool, yarn, tallow, and hides. The title of Mayor of Cork that was established by royal charter in 1318 was changed to Lord Mayor in 1900 following the knighthood of the incumbent mayor by Queen Victoria on her visit to the city.

Since the 19th century, Cork had been a strongly Irish nationalist city, with widespread support for Irish Home Rule, and the Irish Parliamentary Party, but from 1910 stood firmly behind William O'Brien's dissident All-for-Ireland Party. O'Brien published a third local newspaper, the Cork Free Press. Cork was overtaken by Belfast as Ireland's second-largest city in the nineteenth century.

In the War of Independence, the centre of Cork was burnt down by the British Black and Tans, in an event known as the "Burning of Cork" and saw fierce fighting between Irish guerrillas and British forces. During the Irish Civil War, Cork was for a time held by anti-Treaty forces, until it was retaken by the pro-Treaty National Army in an attack from the sea.

=== City boundary ===
The county of the city of Cork was defined by a charter granted on 10 March 1608 by James I of England as including the ancient borough of Cork and all lands extending three miles in all directions from the city walls. Most of the area outside of the borough was ceded to County Cork under the Municipal Corporations (Ireland) Act 1840 (forming the new Barony of Cork).

The 1840 boundary was maintained for 115 years, despite requests for boundary extensions being lodged in 1848, 1881, 1903 and 1912. Negotiations between Cork Corporation and Cork County Council in the 1950s regarding areas where Cork Corporation had built or was planning to build local authority housing resulted in a small boundary extension of 857 acres taking effect on 1 April 1955. A larger extension of 6,520 acres took effect on 1 July 1965.

In 2018, cabinet approval was given for a further extension of the Cork City boundary, to include Cork Airport, Douglas, Ballincollig and other surrounding areas. Legislation to expand the boundary of the city, which would increase its area to 187 km^{2} (72 sq mi) and the population within its bounds from 125,000 to 210,000, was debated and approved in Dáil Éireann in June 2018. Corresponding legislation was drafted during July 2018, and enacted as part of the Local Government Act 2019. The boundary change occurred on 31 May 2019, following the 2019 local elections.

Changes to city boundaries
Year	Changes
1955	Transfer of Fairview, Churchfield, Horgan's Buildings, The Lough, Killeenreendowney, Ballyphehane and Capwell from County Cork
1965	Transfer of areas including Model Farm Road, Fairhill, Ballyvolane, Glasheen, Wilton, Ballinlough and Blackrock from County Cork
2019	Transfer of Rochestown, Douglas, Grange, Donnybrook, Frankfield, Cork Airport, Togher, Ballincollig, Kerry Pike, Tower, Blarney, Killeens, Ballyvolane, White's Cross, and Glanmire from County Cork

== Climate ==
The climate of Cork, like the majority of Ireland, is mild oceanic (Cfb in the Köppen climate classification) and changeable with abundant rainfall and a lack of temperature extremes. Cork lies in plant hardiness zone 9b. Met Éireann maintains a climatological weather station at Cork Airport, a few kilometres south of the city centre. The airport is at an altitude of 153 metres (502 ft) and temperatures can often differ by a few degrees between the airport and the rest of the city. There are also smaller synoptic weather stations at UCC and Clover Hill. Due to its position on the coast, Cork city is subject to occasional flooding.

Temperatures below 0 °C (32 °F) or above 25 °C (77 °F) are rare. Cork Airport records an average of 1,239 millimetres (48.8 in) of precipitation annually, most of which is rain. The airport records an average of 6.5 days of hail and 9.5 days of snow or sleet a year; though it only records lying snow for 2 days of the year. The low altitude of the city, and moderating influences of the harbour, mean that lying snow very rarely occurs in the city itself. At Cork airport, there are on average 218 "rainy" days a year (over 0.2 millimetres (0.008 in) of rainfall), of which there are 80 days with "heavy rain" (over 5 millimetres (0.2 in)). Cork is also a generally foggy city, with an average of 97.8 days of fog a year, most common during mornings and winter. Despite this, however, Cork is also one of Ireland's sunniest cities, with an average of 4.04 hours of sunshine every day and only having 63.7 days where there is no "recordable sunshine", mostly during and around winter.

Climate data for Cork Airport (ORK) (1991−2020 normals, extremes 1961-present)
Month	Jan	Feb	Mar	Apr	May	Jun	Jul	Aug	Sep	Oct	Nov	Dec	Year
Record high °C (°F)	16.1 (61.0)	14.0 (57.2)	18.8 (65.8)	21.2 (70.2)	25.5 (77.9)	27.5 (81.5)	28.7 (83.7)	28.3 (82.9)	24.7 (76.5)	21.4 (70.5)	16.2 (61.2)	13.8 (56.8)	28.7 (83.7)
Mean daily maximum °C (°F)	8.2 (46.8)	8.5 (47.3)	9.8 (49.6)	12.0 (53.6)	14.6 (58.3)	17.0 (62.6)	18.6 (65.5)	18.4 (65.1)	16.5 (61.7)	13.3 (55.9)	10.3 (50.5)	8.7 (47.7)	13.0 (55.4)
Daily mean °C (°F)	5.7 (42.3)	5.8 (42.4)	6.8 (44.2)	8.6 (47.5)	11.1 (52.0)	13.6 (56.5)	15.2 (59.4)	15.0 (59.0)	13.4 (56.1)	10.6 (51.1)	7.8 (46.0)	6.2 (43.2)	10.0 (50.0)
Mean daily minimum °C (°F)	3.2 (37.8)	3.2 (37.8)	3.9 (39.0)	5.3 (41.5)	7.6 (45.7)	10.1 (50.2)	11.7 (53.1)	11.6 (52.9)	10.2 (50.4)	8.0 (46.4)	5.3 (41.5)	3.8 (38.8)	7.0 (44.6)
Record low °C (°F)	−8.5 (16.7)	−8.6 (16.5)	−6.1 (21.0)	−2.4 (27.7)	−0.9 (30.4)	2.4 (36.3)	4.8 (40.6)	4.9 (40.8)	2.3 (36.1)	−0.9 (30.4)	−3.3 (26.1)	−7.2 (19.0)	−8.6 (16.5)
Average precipitation mm (inches)	131.3 (5.17)	97.2 (3.83)	91.5 (3.60)	86.5 (3.41)	80.8 (3.18)	83.3 (3.28)	87.2 (3.43)	94.6 (3.72)	92.0 (3.62)	131.2 (5.17)	127.0 (5.00)	136.6 (5.38)	1,239 (48.78)
Average precipitation days (≥ 1.0 mm)	16.7	13.7	13.4	12.3	12.0	10.1	11.9	12.2	11.9	15.1	15.6	16.8	161.7
Average snowy days	2.6	2.5	1.7	0.4	0.0	0.0	0.0	0.0	0.0	0.0	0.3	1.9	9.5
Average relative humidity (%)	88.8	87.0	85.0	82.3	81.9	81.8	83.8	84.7	86.6	88.1	89.2	89.5	85.7
Average dew point °C (°F)	4.2 (39.6)	3.9 (39.0)	4.3 (39.7)	5.4 (41.7)	7.7 (45.9)	10.1 (50.2)	12.1 (53.8)	12.1 (53.8)	10.9 (51.6)	8.6 (47.5)	6.3 (43.3)	4.8 (40.6)	7.5 (45.5)
Mean monthly sunshine hours	60.9	74.2	110.5	160.4	191.1	184.1	164.1	158.4	129.0	98.9	74.5	54.7	1,460.8
Source 1: Met Éireann
Source 2: NOAA Servizio Meteorologico (extremes)

== Culture ==
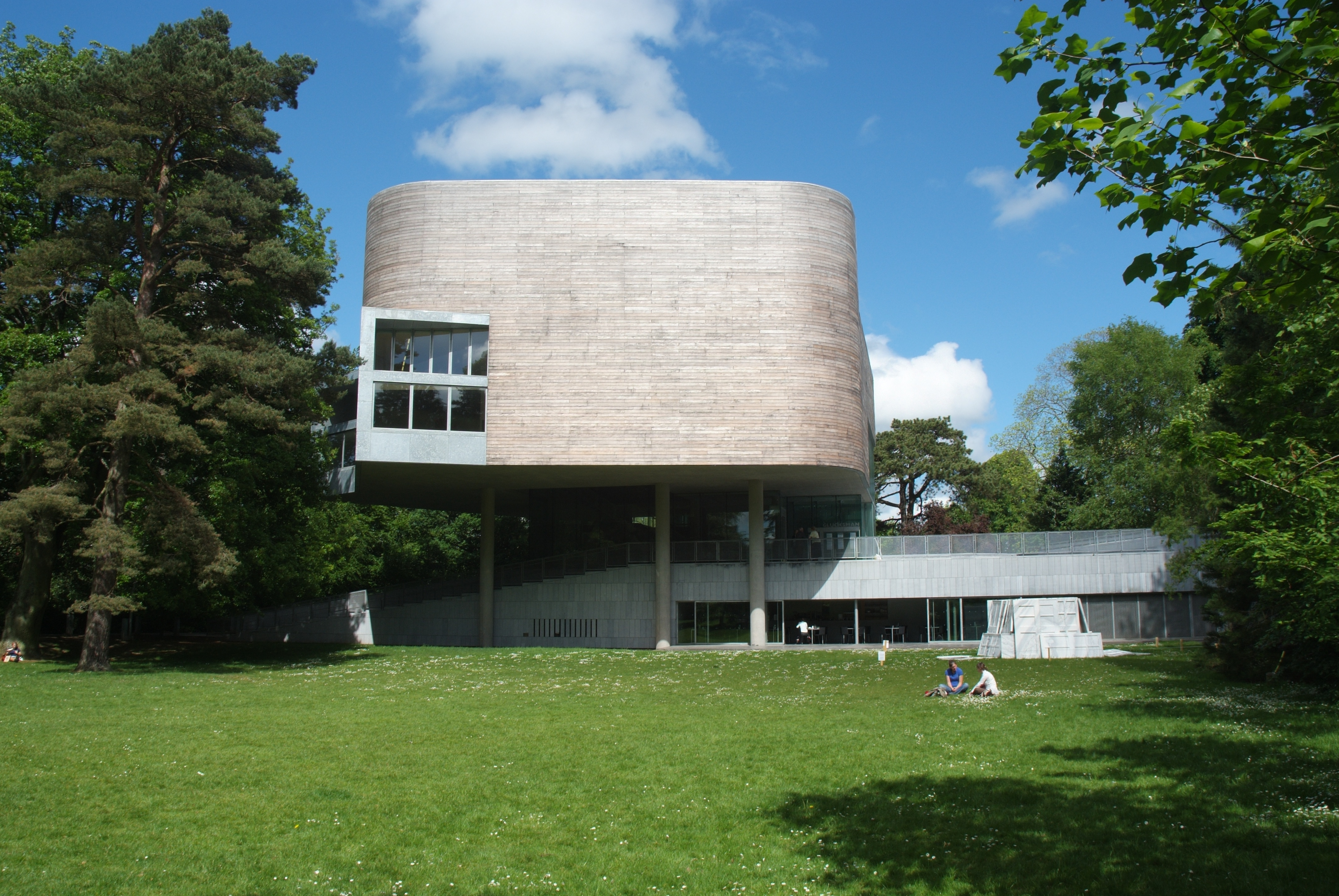
The Lewis Glucksman Gallery at UCC

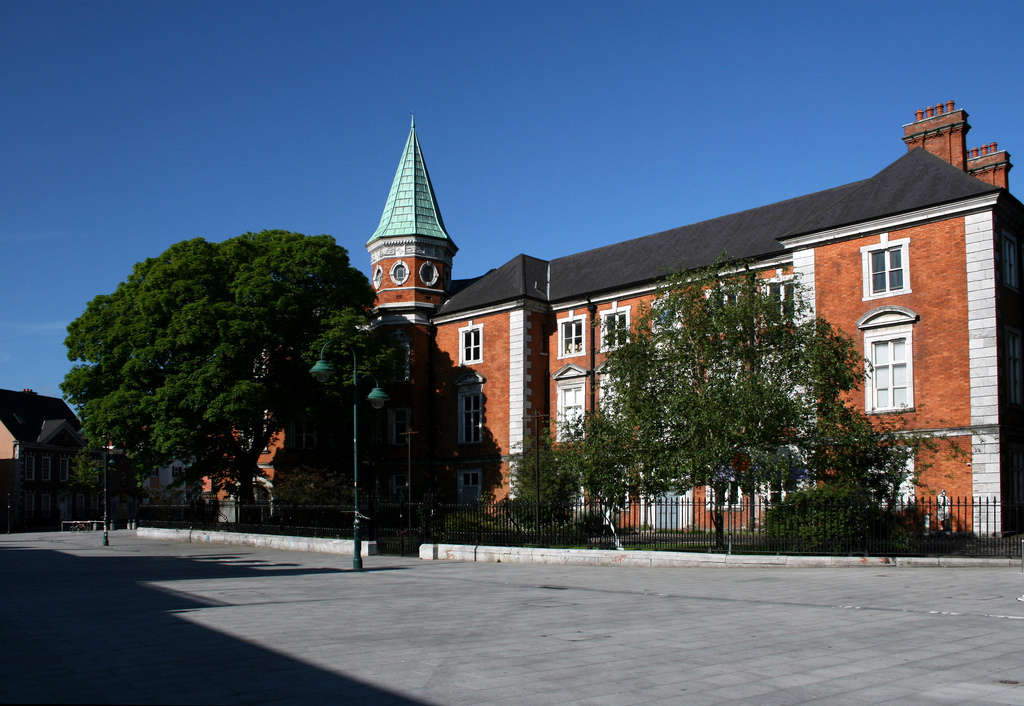
Crawford Art Gallery

The Cork School of Music and the Crawford College of Art and Design provide a throughput of new blood, as do the theatre components of several courses at University College Cork (UCC). Important elements in the cultural life of the city include Corcadorca Theatre Company, of which Cillian Murphy was a troupe member; the Institute for Choreography and Dance, a national contemporary dance resource; the Triskel Arts Centre (capacity c. 90), which includes the Triskel Christchurch independent cinema; dance venue the Firkin Crane (capacity c. 240); the Cork Academy of Dramatic Art (CADA), Montfort College of Performing Arts; Graffiti Theatre Company; and the Cork Jazz Festival, the Cork Film Festival and Live at the Marquee events. The Everyman Palace Theatre (capacity c. 650) and the Granary Theatre (capacity c. 150) both host plays throughout the year.

Cork is home to the RTÉ Vanbrugh Quartet and rock musicians and bands including John Spillane, Rory Gallagher, Five Go Down to the Sea?, Microdisney, The Frank and Walters, Sultans of Ping, Simple Kid, Fred and Mick Flannery. The opera singers Cara O'Sullivan, Mary Hegarty, Brendan Collins, and Sam McElroy were also born in Cork.

Ranging in capacity from 50 to 1,000, the main music venues in the city are the Cork Opera House (capacity c. 1000), The Everyman, Cork Arts Theatre, Cyprus Avenue, Dali, Triskel Christchurch, The Roundy, and Coughlan's.

Cork's literary community centres on the Munster Literature Centre and the Triskel Arts Centre. The short story writers Frank O'Connor and Seán Ó Faoláin hailed from Cork, and contemporary writers include Thomas McCarthy, Gerry Murphy, and novelist and poet William Wall.

Additions to the arts infrastructure include modern additions to the Crawford Municipal Art Gallery and renovations to the Cork Opera House in the early 21st century. The Lewis Glucksman Gallery opened in 2004 at UCC and was nominated for the Stirling Prize in the United Kingdom. A new School of Music was completed in 2007.

Cork was the European Capital of Culture for 2005, and in 2009 was included in Lonely Planet's top 10 "Best in Travel 2010". The guide called Cork "at the top of its game: sophisticated, vibrant and diverse".

There is a "friendly rivalry" between Cork and Dublin, similar to the first and second city rivalry between Manchester and London or Melbourne and Sydney. Some Corkonians view themselves as different from the rest of Ireland and call themselves "The Rebels"; the county is known as the "Rebel County". This view sometimes manifests itself in humorous references to the Real Capital and the propagation of t-shirts and street art celebrating the fictional "People's Republic of Cork".

=== Food ===
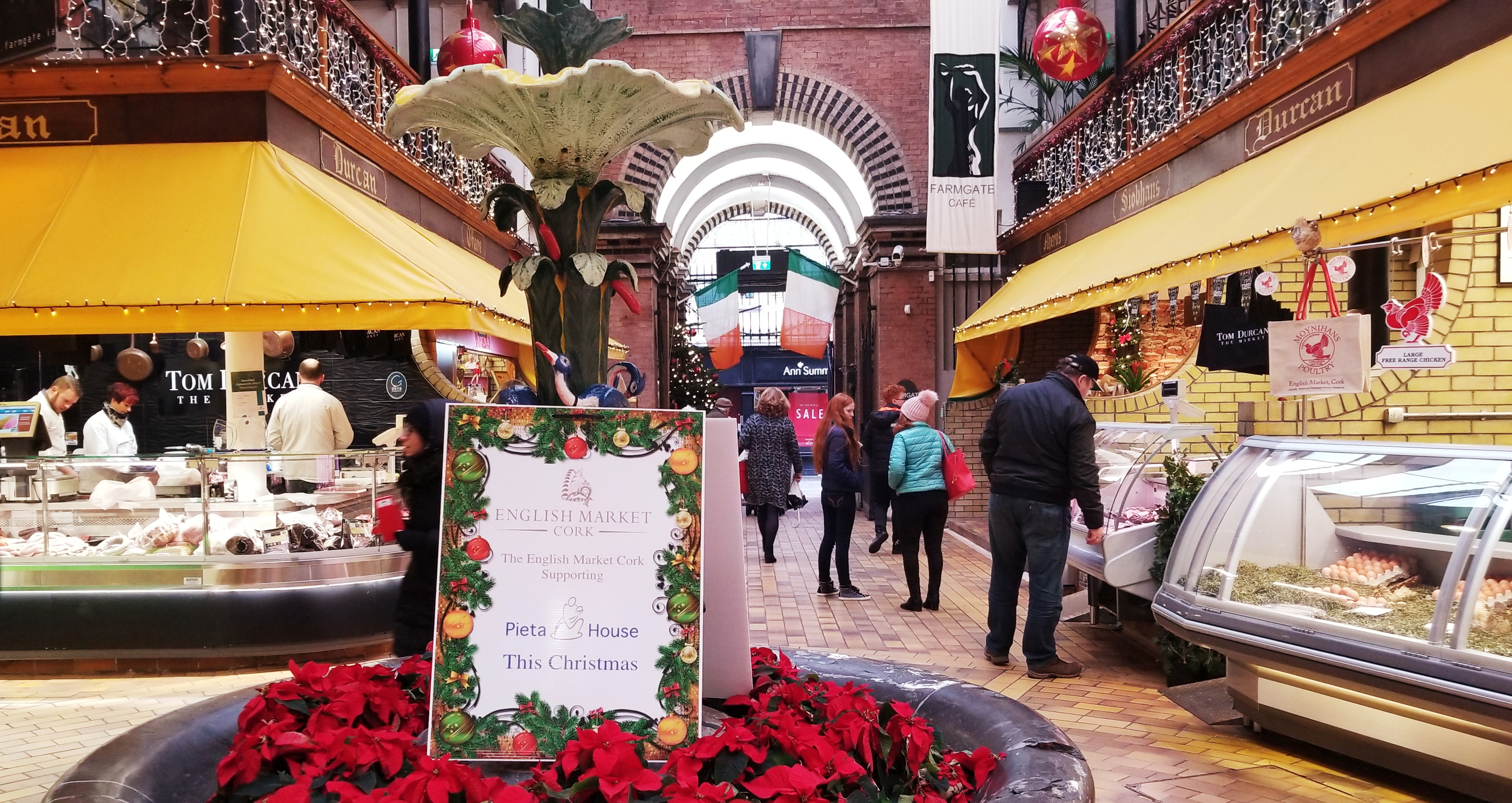
The English Market

The city has many local traditions in food, including crubeens, tripe and drisheen, which were historically served in eating houses like those run by Katty Barry in the mid-20th century. The English Market sells locally produced foods, including fresh fish, meats, fruit and vegetables, eggs and artisan cheeses and breads. During certain city festivals, food stalls are also sometimes erected on city streets such as St. Patrick's Street or Grand Parade.

In September 2020, the food hall Marina Market was established in the docklands area of the city. A former warehouse, the Marina Market is an indoor, open-air space in which food vendors operate, and also incorporates an events space. One year later in September 2021, The Black Market opened in the Ballintemple area. The Black Market is a similar concept to the Marina Market. Izz Cafe, a Palestinian restaurant which opened in the city in 2019, has won several awards.

=== Accent ===
The Cork accent, part of the Southwest dialect of Hiberno-English, displays various features which set it apart from other accents in Ireland. Patterns of tone and intonation often rise and fall, with the overall tone tending to be more high-pitched than other Irish accents. English spoken in Cork has several dialect words that are peculiar to the city and environs. Like standard Hiberno-English, some of these words originate from the Irish language, but others through other languages Cork's inhabitants encountered at home and abroad. The Cork accent displays varying degrees of rhoticity, usually indicative of the speaker's local community.

== Media ==
=== Broadcasting ===
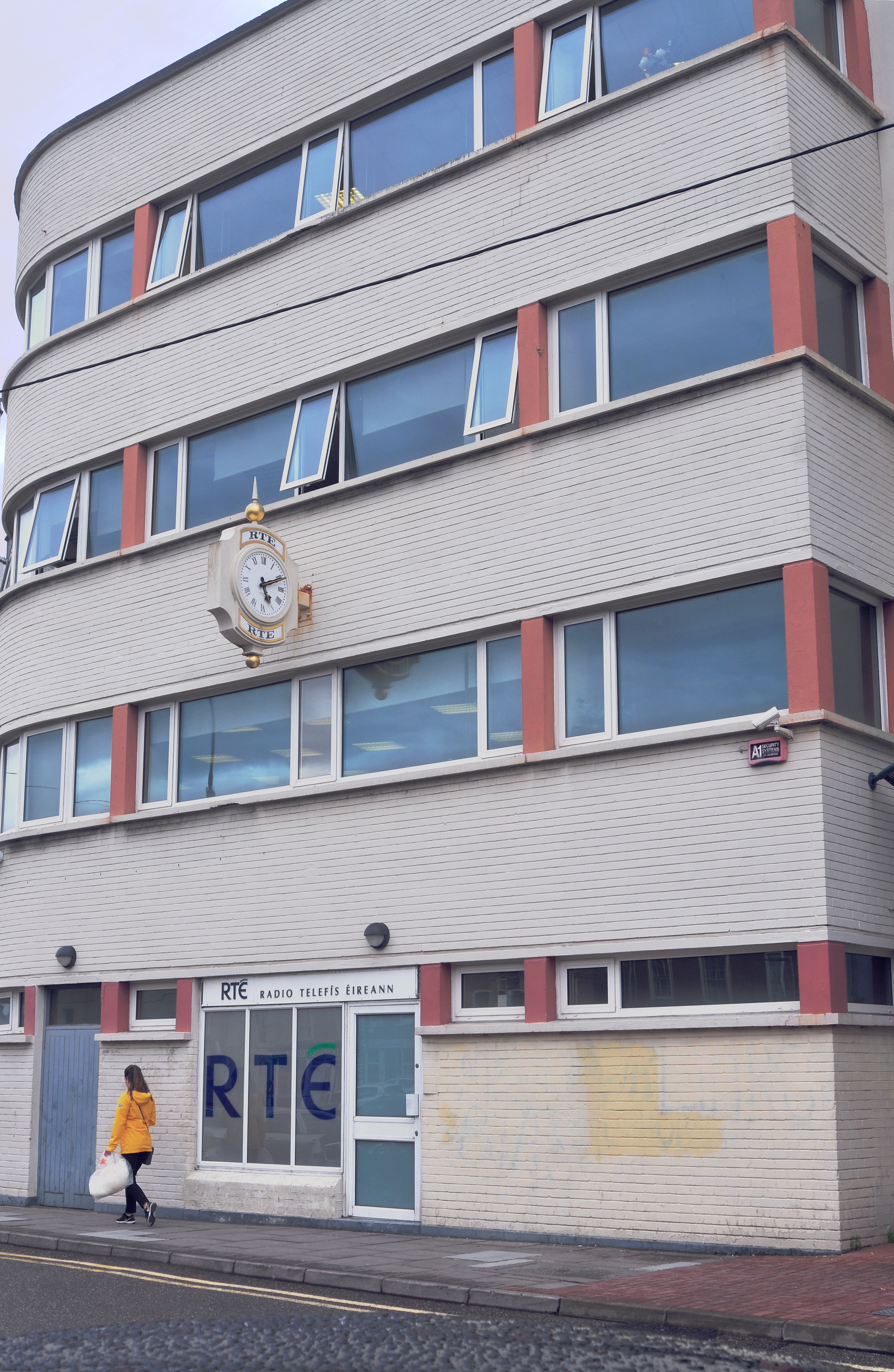
RTÉ's Cork studios

Broadcasting companies based in Cork include RTÉ Cork, which has a radio, television and production unit on Father Matthew Street in the city centre. Communicorp Media opened a radio studio in 2019 in the city covering content on both Today FM and Newstalk.

The city's FM radio band features RTÉ Radio 1, RTÉ 2fm, RTÉ lyric fm, RTÉ Raidió na Gaeltachta, Today FM, Classic Hits, Newstalk and the religious station Spirit Radio. There are also local stations such as Cork's 96FM, Cork's Red FM, C103, CUH 102.0FM, UCC 98.3FM (formerly Cork Campus Radio 97.4fm) and Christian radio station Life 93.1FM. Cork also has a temporary licensed citywide community station 'Cork City Community Radio' on 100.5FM, which is on-air on Saturdays, Sundays and Mondays only. Cork was home to several pirate radio stations, including South Coast Radio and ERI, in the 1980s.

=== Print ===
Cork is home to one of Ireland's main national newspapers, the Irish Examiner (formerly the Cork Examiner). Its "sister paper", The Echo (formerly the Evening Echo), was for decades connected to the "Echo boys", who were poor and often homeless children who sold the newspaper. Today, the shouts of the vendors selling The Echo can still be heard in parts of the city centre. One of the biggest free newspapers in the city is the Cork Independent. The city's university publishes the UCC Express and Motley magazine.

== Places of interest ==
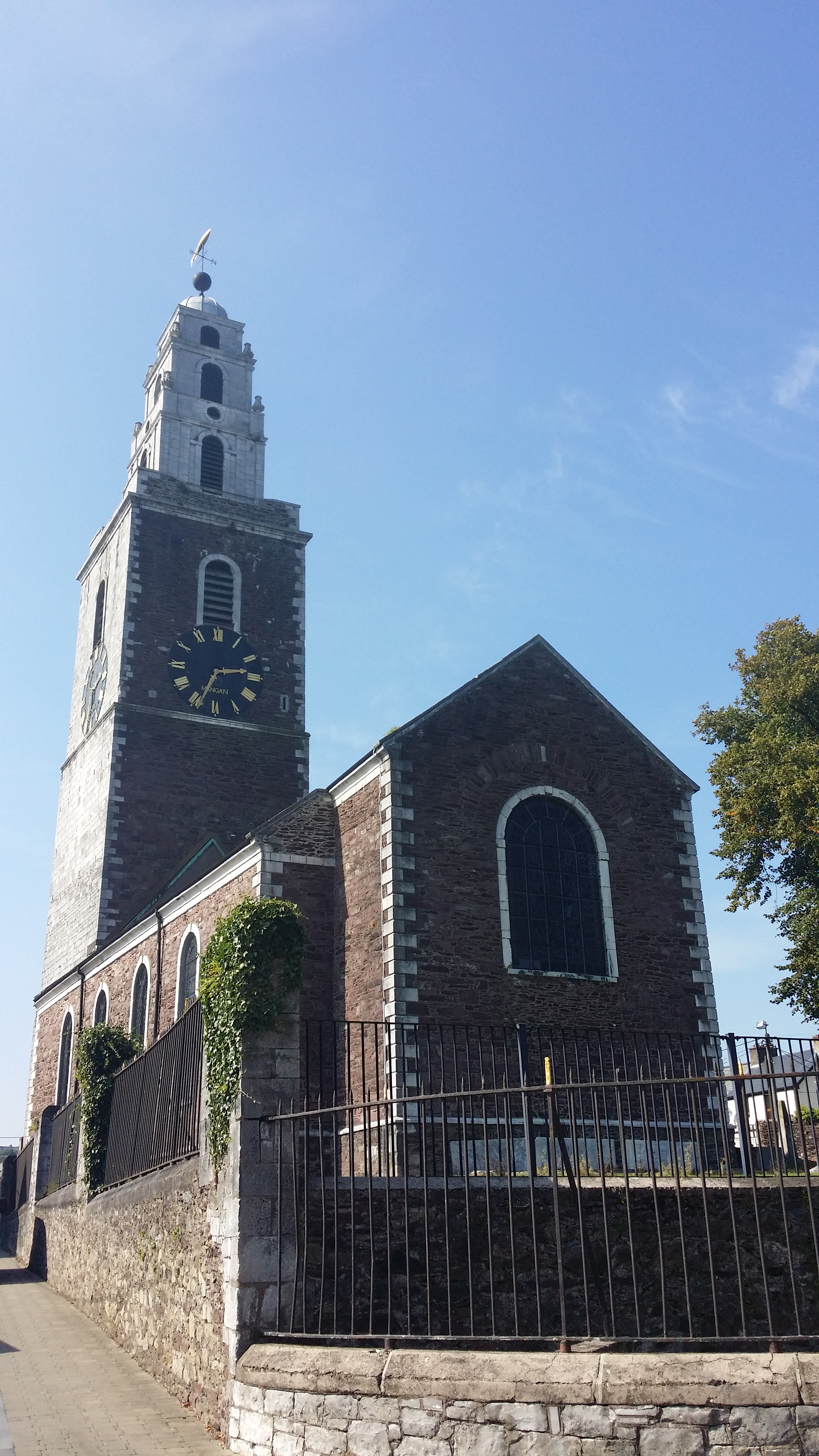
St. Anne's Shandon

Cork features architecturally notable buildings originating from the Medieval to Modern periods. The only notable remnant of the Medieval era is the Red Abbey. There are two cathedrals in the city; St. Mary's Cathedral and Saint Fin Barre's Cathedral. St Mary's Cathedral, often referred to as the North Cathedral, is the Catholic cathedral of the city and was begun in 1808. Its distinctive tower was added in the 1860s. St Fin Barre's Cathedral serves the Church of Ireland (Anglican) and is possibly the more famous of the two. It is built on the foundations of an earlier cathedral. Work began in 1862 and ended in 1879 under the direction of architect William Burges.

St. Patrick's Street, the main street of the city which was remodelled in the mid-2000s is known for the architecture of the buildings along its pedestrian-friendly route and is the main shopping thoroughfare. At its northern end is a landmark statue of Father Mathew. The reason for its curved shape is that it was originally a channel of the River Lee which was built over arches. The General Post Office, with its limestone façade, is on Oliver Plunkett Street, on the site of the Theatre Royal which was built in 1760 and burned down in 1840. The English circus proprietor Pablo Fanque rebuilt an amphitheatre on the spot in 1850, which was subsequently transformed into a theatre and then into the present General Post Office in 1877. The Grand Parade is a tree-lined avenue, home to offices, shops and financial institutions. The old financial centre is the South Mall, with several banks whose interiors derive from the 19th century, such as the interior of the Allied Irish Bank which was once an exchange.

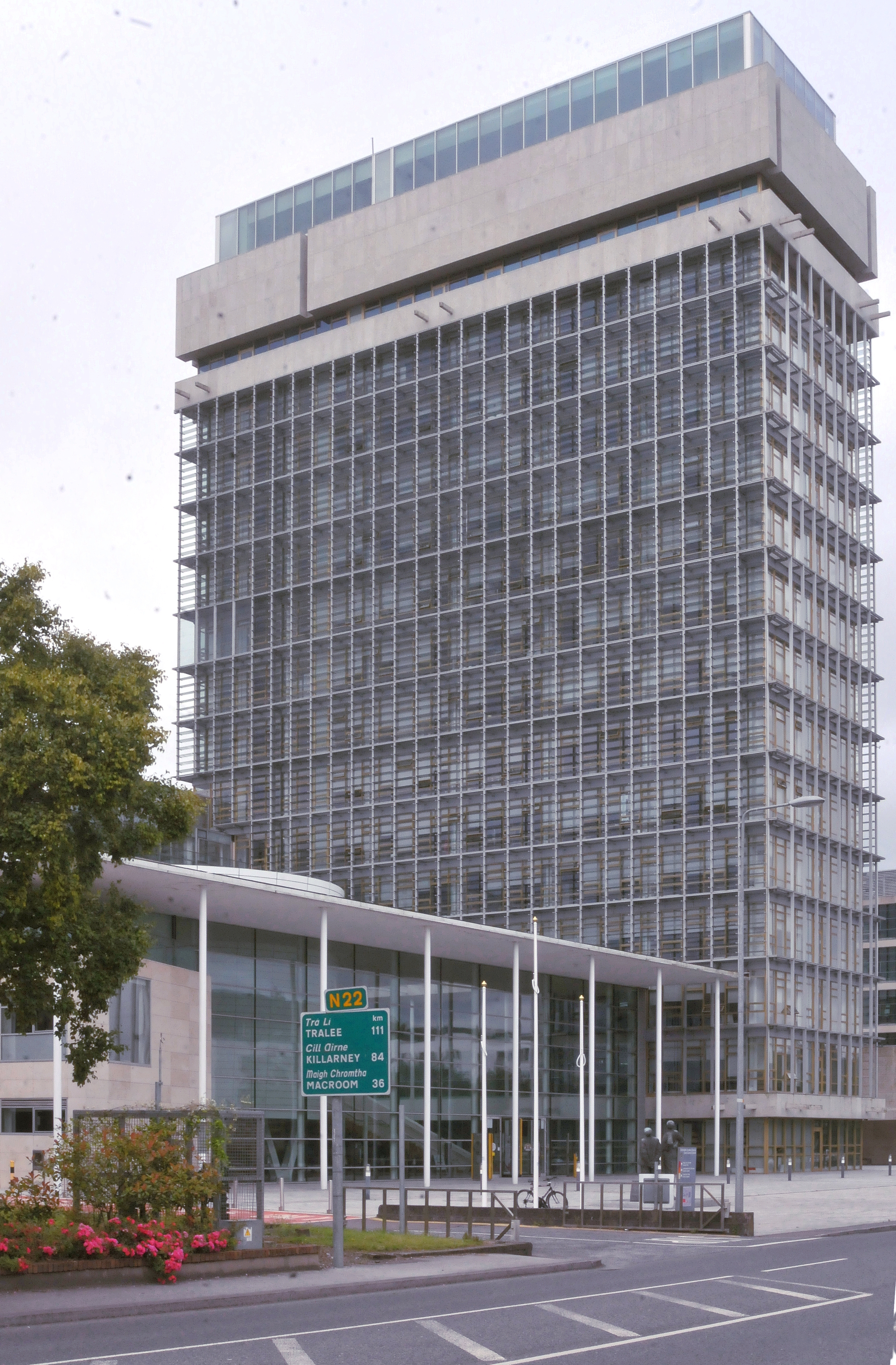
Cork County Hall

Many of the city's buildings are in the Georgian style, although there are a number of examples of modern landmark structures, such as County Hall tower, which was, at one time the tallest building in Ireland until being superseded by another Cork building: The Elysian. Outside the County Hall is the landmark sculpture of two men, known locally as 'Cha and Miah'. Across the river from County Hall is Ireland's longest building; built in Victorian times, Our Lady's Psychiatric Hospital has now been partially renovated and converted into a residential housing complex called Atkins Hall, after its architect William Atkins.

Cork's most famous building is the church tower of St Anne in Shandon, which dominates the Northside of the city. It is widely regarded as the symbol of the city. The North and East sides are faced in red sandstone, and the West and South sides are clad in the predominant stone of the region, white limestone. At the top sits a weather vane in the form of an eleven-foot salmon. Another site in Shandon is Skiddy's Almshouse, which was built in the 18th century to provide a home to the poorest of the city.

Cork City Hall replaced the hall destroyed by the Black and Tans during the War of Independence in an event known as the "Burning of Cork". The cost of this new building was provided by the UK Government in the 1930s as a gesture of reconciliation.

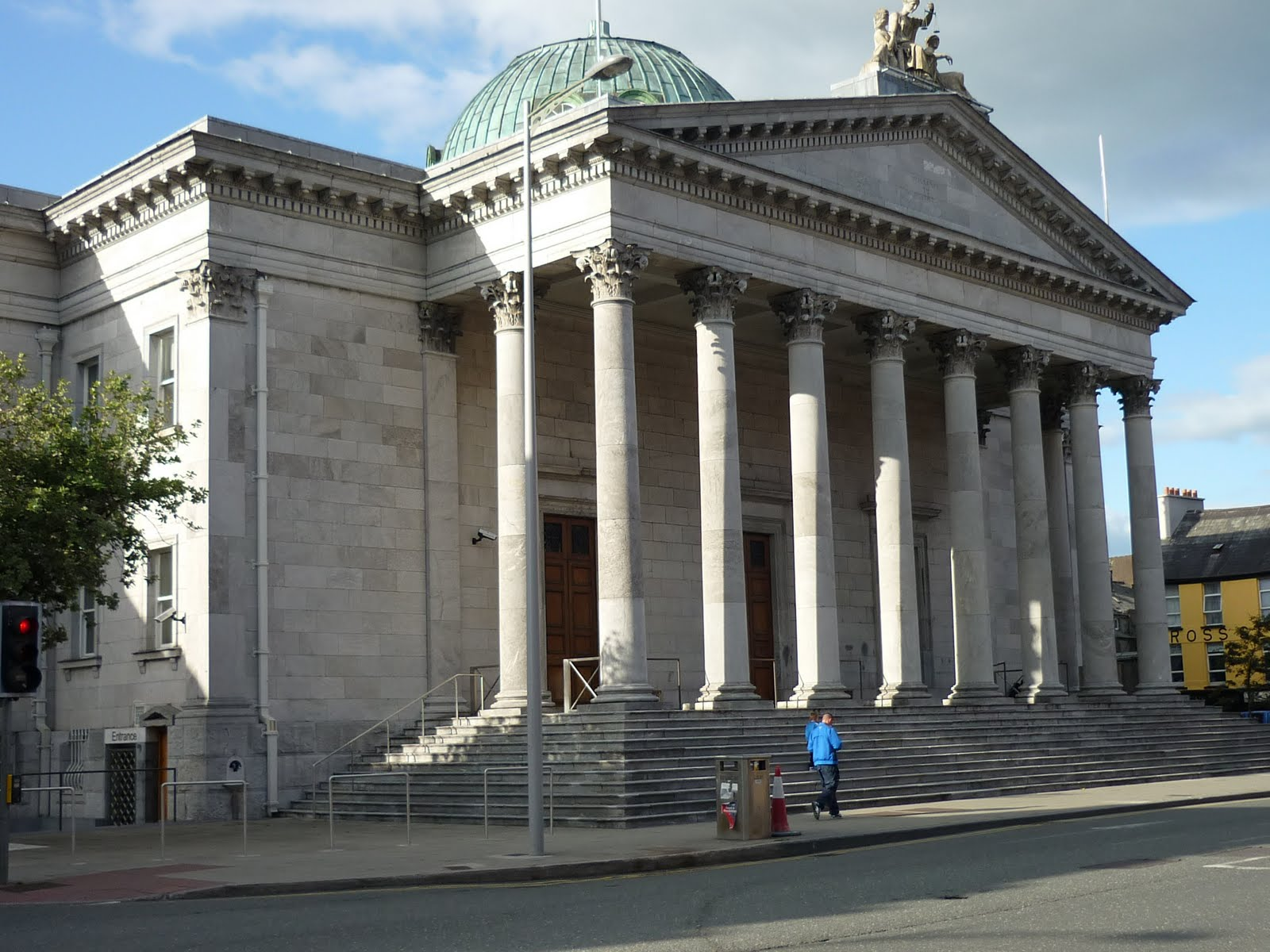
The courthouse in Washington Street

Other notable places include Elizabeth Fort, the Cork Opera House, Christ Church on South Main Street (now the Triskel Arts Centre, and the original site of early Hiberno-Norse church), Blackrock Castle and St Mary's Dominican Church on Popes Quay. Other popular tourist attractions include the grounds of University College Cork, through which the River Lee flows, the Women's Gaol at Sunday's Well (now a heritage centre) and the English Market. This covered market traces its origins back to 1610, and the present building dates from 1786.

Parks and amenity spaces include Fitzgerald's Park to the west of the city (which contains the Cork Public Museum), the angling lake known as The Lough, Bishop Lucey Park (which is centrally located and contains a portion of the old city wall) and the Marina and Atlantic Pond (an avenue and amenity near Blackrock used by joggers, runners and rowing clubs).

Up until April 2009, there were also two large commercial breweries in the city. The Beamish and Crawford on South Main Street closed in April 2009 and transferred production to the Murphy's brewery in Lady's Well. This brewery also produces Heineken for the Irish market. There is also the Franciscan Well brewery, which started as an independent brewery in 1998 but has since been acquired by Coors.

== Local government and politics ==
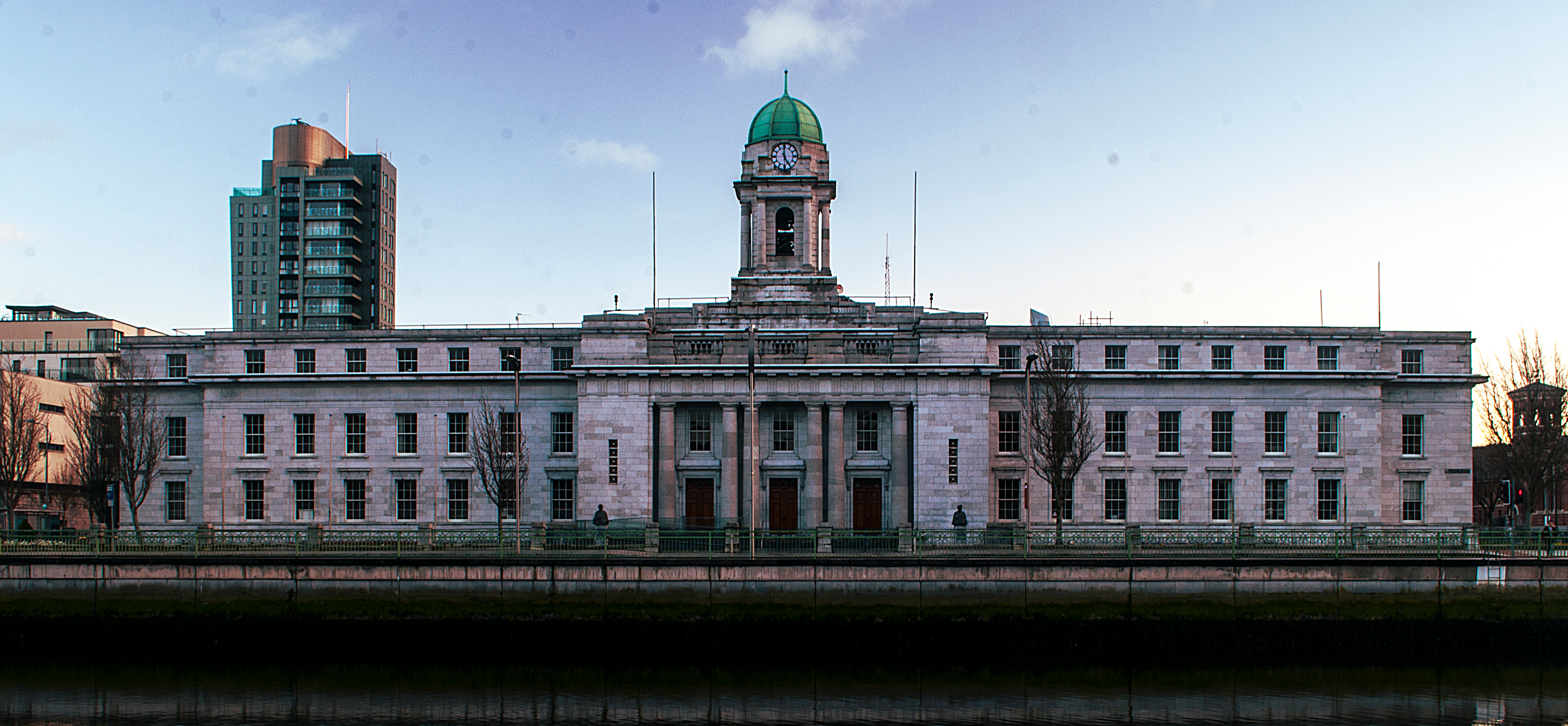
Cork City Hall

With a population of more than 222,000, Cork is the second-most populous city in the state and the 16th-most populous local government area.

Under the Local Government (Ireland) Act 1898, it was made a county borough, governed by a county borough corporation. This was altered by the Local Government Act 2001, under each of the five county boroughs became designated as cities, governed by city councils. City councils are local authorities with the same status in law as a county council.

While the local government in Ireland has limited powers in comparison with other countries, the council has responsibility for planning, roads, sanitation, libraries, street lighting, parks, and several other important functions. Cork City Council has 31 elected members representing six electoral areas.

As of the 2024 Cork City Council election, the political representation is: Fianna Fáil (9 members), Fine Gael (5 members), Sinn Féin (4 members), Green Party (3 members), Labour (3 member), People Before Profit–Solidarity (1 member), Independent Ireland (1 member), Independents (4 members). Certain councillors are co-opted to represent the city at the South-West Regional Authority. The Lord Mayor of Cork is chosen annually, by the elected members of the council, under a D'Hondt system count.

Cork City Hall is located along Albert Quay on the south side of the city. It officially opened on 8 September 1936, following the previous building being destroyed in the Burning of Cork in 1920. The administrative offices for Cork County Council are also located within the city limits, on the Carrigrohane Road on the west side of the city.

=== National politics ===
The city is part of two Dáil constituencies: Cork North-Central and Cork South-Central which each return five TDs.

Historically, the city was represented in the Dáil by Cork City from 1977 to 1981, by the two constituencies of Cork City North-West and Cork City South-East from 1969 to 1977, and by Cork Borough from 1921 to 1969. In the House of Commons of the United Kingdom, it was represented by Cork City from 1801 to 1922, and in the Irish House of Commons, it was represented by Cork City from 1264 to 1800.

== Economy ==
=== Retail ===
The retail trade in Cork city includes a mix of modern shopping centres and family-owned local shops. Shopping centres can be found in several of Cork's suburbs, including Blackpool, Ballincollig, Douglas, Ballyvolane, Wilton and at Mahon Point Shopping Centre.

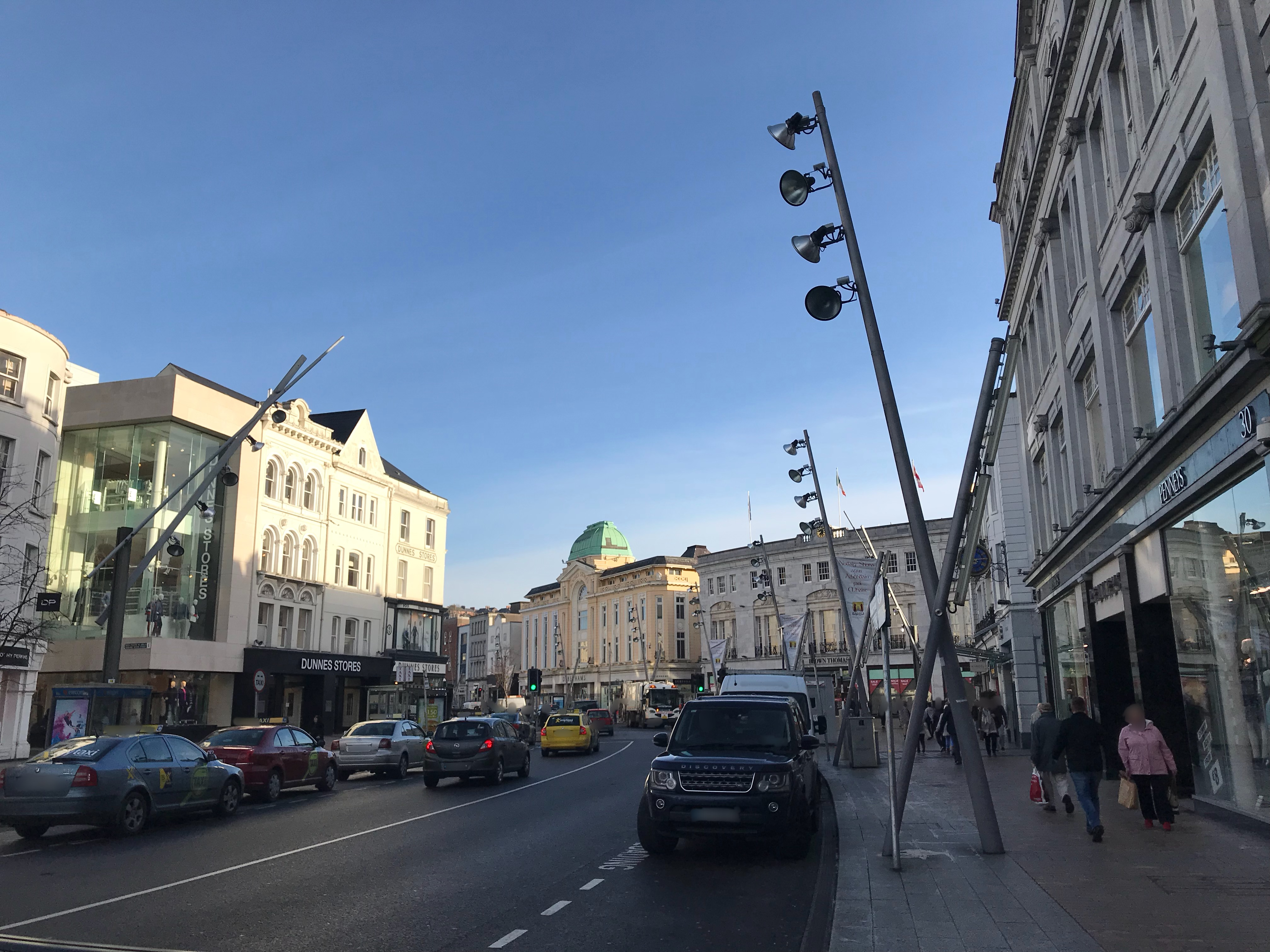
Patrick's Street, Cork's main shopping street

Other shopping arcades are in the city centre, including the "Cornmarket Centre" on Cornmarket Street, "Merchant's Quay Shopping Centre" on Merchant's Quay, home to Debenhams, Dunnes Stores and Marks & Spencer, and a retail street called Opera Lane off St. Patrick's Street/Academy Street. A mixed retail and office development, on the site of the former Capitol Cineplex, with approximately 5,600 square metres (60,000 ft^{2}) of retail space, was opened in June 2017. Retail tenants in this development include Facebook, AlienVault and Huawei.

Cork's main shopping street is St. Patrick's Street and is the most expensive in the country per sq. metre after Dublin's Grafton Street. The area was impacted by the post-2008 downturn, though retail growth has increased since, with Penneys announcing expansion plans in 2015, redesigning of some facades on the street, and opening of newer outlets, including Superdry in 2015. Other shopping areas in the city centre include Oliver Plunkett St. and Grand Parade. Cork is home to some of the country's leading department stores with the foundations of shops such as Dunnes Stores and the former Roches Stores being laid in the city.

=== Industry ===
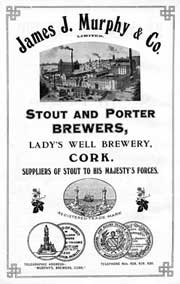
Murphys Stout, 1919 advert for the Cork brewery

Cork City is a hub of industry in the region. Several pharmaceutical companies have invested heavily in the area, including American companies Pfizer, Johnson & Johnson and Swiss company Novartis. Perhaps the most famous product of the Cork pharmaceutical industry is Viagra. Cork is also the European headquarters of Apple Inc. where more than 6,000 staff are involved in manufacturing, R&D and customer support. Logitech and Dell (formerly EMC Corporation) are also important IT employers in the area. Three hospitals are also among the top ten employers in the city.

The city is also home to the Heineken Brewery that brews Murphy's Irish Stout and the nearby Beamish and Crawford brewery (taken over by Heineken in 2008) which have been in the city for generations. 45% of the world's Tic Tac sweets are manufactured at the city's Ferrero factory. For many years, Cork was the home to Ford Motor Company, which manufactured cars in the docklands area before the plant was closed in 1984. Henry Ford's grandfather was from West Cork, which was one of the main reasons for opening up the manufacturing facility in Cork. Technology has since replaced the older manufacturing businesses of the 1970s and 1980s, with people now working at several IT companies across the city area—such as Amazon.com, the online retailer, which has offices at Cork Airport Business Park.

Cork's deep harbour allows large ships to enter, bringing trade and easy import/export of products. Cork Airport also allows easy access to continental Europe and Cork Kent railway station in the city centre provides good rail links for domestic trade.

=== Employment ===
According to the 2011 Cork City Employment & Land Use Survey, the single largest employers in the city (all with over 1,000 employees) included Cork University Hospital, Apple Inc, University College Cork, Boston Scientific, Cork City Council, Cork Institute of Technology, Bon Secours Hospital, Cork, retailers Supervalu and Centra, the Irish Defence Forces at Collins Barracks, and the Mercy University Hospital.

== Transport ==
=== Air ===
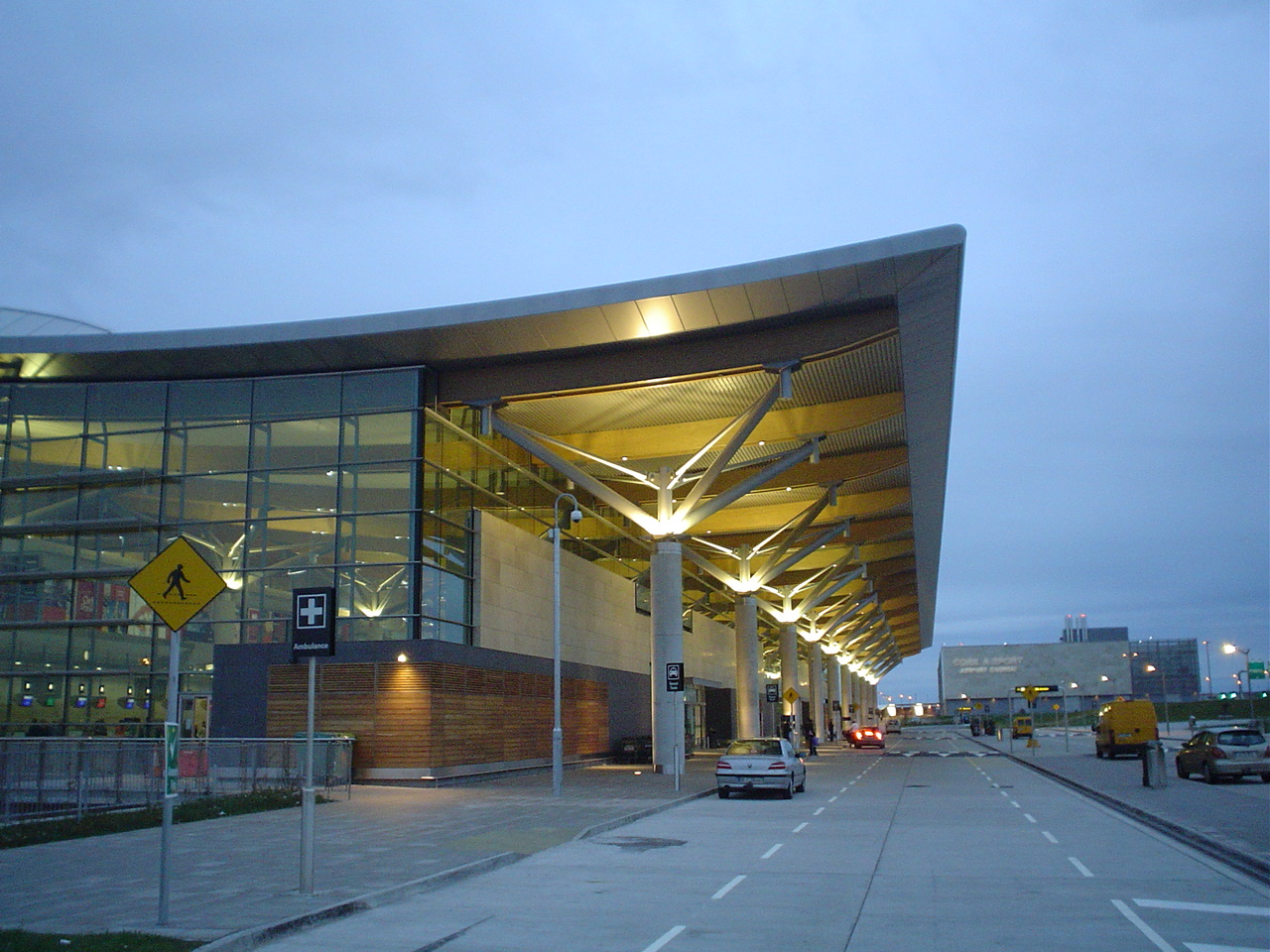
Cork Airport

Cork Airport is the second-busiest airport in Ireland and is situated on the south side of Cork city close to Ballygarvan. Nine airlines fly to more than 45 destinations in Europe.

=== Bus ===
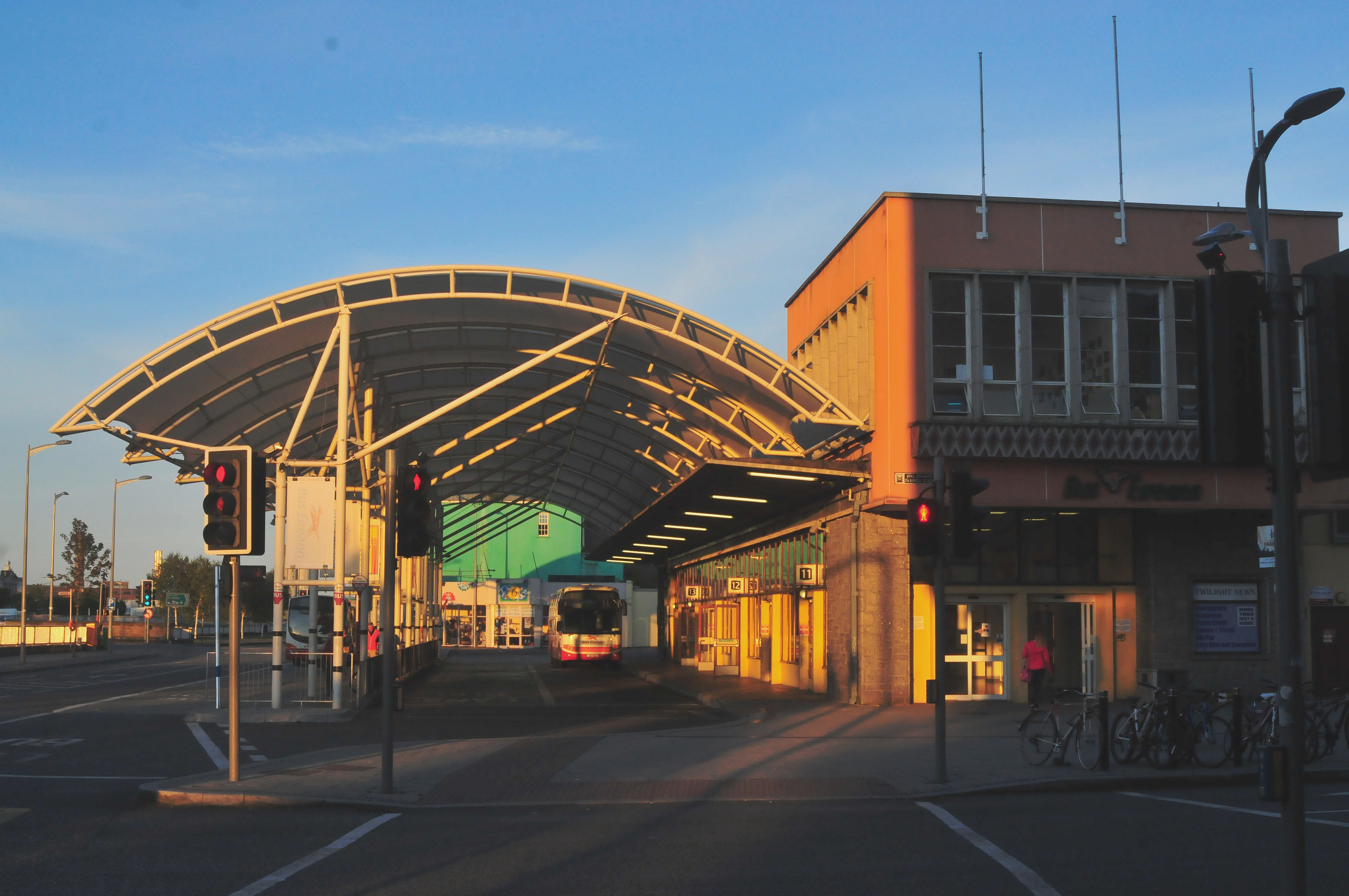
The main bus terminal at Parnell Place

Public bus services within the city are provided by the national bus operator Bus Éireann. City routes are numbered 201 through 226 and connect the city centre to the principal suburbs, colleges, shopping centres and places of interest. Prior to 2011, city routes were numbered 1 through 19; however, the introduction of real-time bus signage required the move to the 2xx namespace. Buses to the outer suburbs and towns, such as Ballincollig, Glanmire, Midleton and Carrigaline are provided from the city's bus terminal at Parnell Place in the city centre. Suburban services also include shuttles to Cork Airport, and a park and ride facility in the south suburbs.

The first 24-hour bus in Ireland, route 220, was initiated in Cork in January 2019. The 220 links the satellite towns of Ballincollig and Carrigaline with the city centre and operates hourly between 01:30 and 05:30. As of 2022, the 24-hour service supported 1.3 million customer journeys, and some local politicians called for the introduction of further such routes in the city.

Long-distance buses depart from the bus terminal in Parnell Place to destinations throughout Ireland. Hourly services run to Killarney/Tralee, Waterford, Athlone and Shannon Airport/Ennis/Limerick/Galway and there are six services daily to Dublin.

Private operators include Irish Citylink (serving Limerick and Galway), Aircoach (serving Dublin City Centre and Dublin Airport) and Dublin Coach (with serving to Dublin via Waterford and Kilkenny).

BusConnects, an ongoing public transport infrastructure programme, aims to improve bus transport across the city as part of the Cork Metropolitan Area Transport Strategy (CMATS). Following the initial rollout of the BusConnects project in Dublin in 2021, by 2022 the National Transport Authority (NTA) had entered into a consultation process for similar changes in Cork city. While the NTA said that they were applying lessons learned from the Dublin scheme, some Cork homeowners voiced concerns over proposed bus corridors and the possibility of losing parts of their gardens and on-street parking, the risk of devaluation of their homes, worries about the impact of construction on the structural integrity of their homes, the loss of hundreds of trees along roads, and the impact on trade which may arise from reduced on-street parking. At least one of the draft proposals, to build a road bridge over Ballybrack Woods in Douglas, was dropped. In their September 2026 progress report, the NTA stated that they intend to deliver 90 km of bus priority "sustainable transport corridors" across Cork, as well as 95 km of cycle facilities. Planning for the related changes, including "two 24-hour routes, more high-frequency services and a simplified numbering system", was underway as of September 2026.

=== Harbour and waterways ===
The Cross River Ferry, from Rushbrooke to Passage West, links the R624 to R610. This service is used by some commuters to avoid traffic in the Jack Lynch Tunnel and Dunkettle area. The Port of Cork is situated at Ringaskiddy, 16 kilometres (10 miles) SE via the N28. Brittany Ferries operates direct car ferry services from Cork to Roscoff in France.

=== Road ===
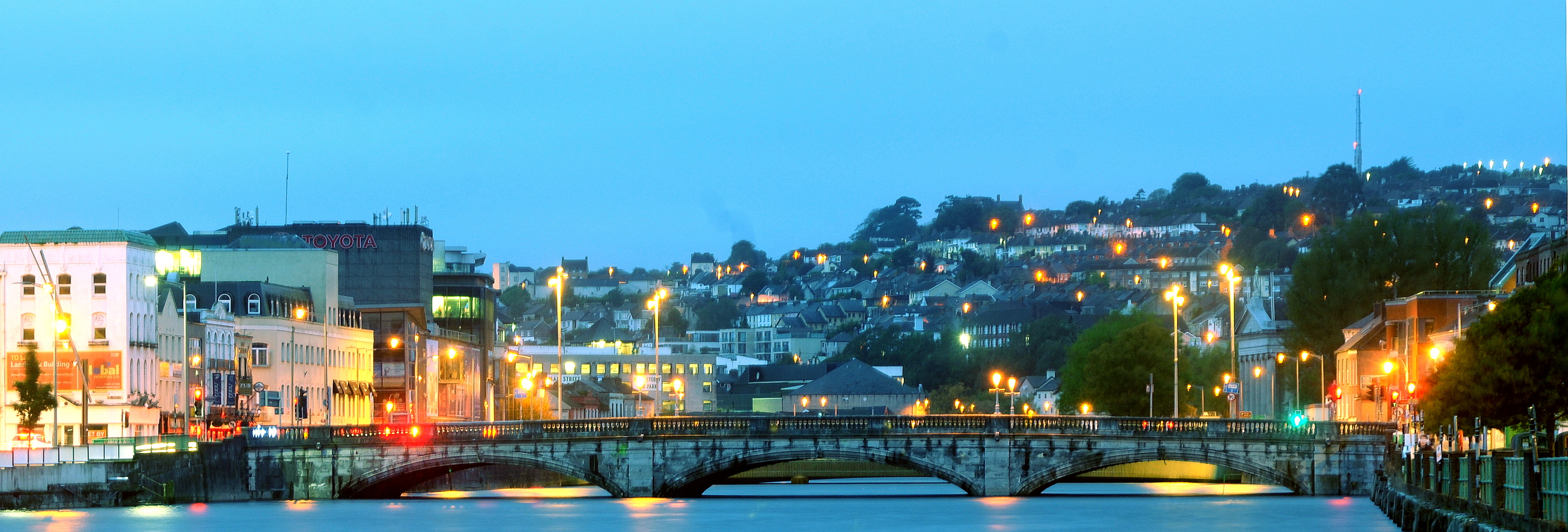
St. Patrick's Bridge

The city's road infrastructure improved in the late 20th and early 21st century, including the early 1980s construction of the Cork South Link dual carriageway which links the Kinsale Road roundabout with the city centre. Shortly after, the first sections of the South Ring dual carriageway were opened. Work continued extending the N25 South Ring Road through the 1990s, culminating in the opening of the Jack Lynch Tunnel under the River Lee. The Kinsale Road flyover opened in August 2006 to remove a bottleneck for traffic heading to Cork Airport or Killarney. Other projects completed at this time include the N20 Blackpool bypass and the N20 Cork to Mallow road projects. The N22 Ballincollig dual carriageway bypass, which links to the Western end of the Cork Southern Ring road was opened in September 2004. City centre road improvements include the Patrick Street project—which reconstructed the street with a pedestrian focus. The M8 motorway links Cork with Dublin.

From 2012, cycle paths and bike stands were added in a number of areas. Subsequently, in 2014, a public bicycle rental scheme was launched. The scheme is operated by An Rothar Nua on behalf of the National Transport Authority, with funding supplemented by an advertising sponsor. The scheme supports 330 bikes with 31 stations placed around the city for paid public use.

=== Rail ===
==== Railway and tramway heritage ====
Cork was one of the most rail-oriented cities in Ireland, featuring eight stations at various times. The main route, still much the same today, is from Dublin Heuston. Originally terminating on the city's outskirts at Blackpool, the route now reaches the city centre terminus of Kent Station via the Glanmire tunnel and Kilnap Viaduct. Now a through station, the line through Kent connects the towns of Cobh and Midleton east of the city. This also connected to the seaside town of Youghal, until the 1980s.

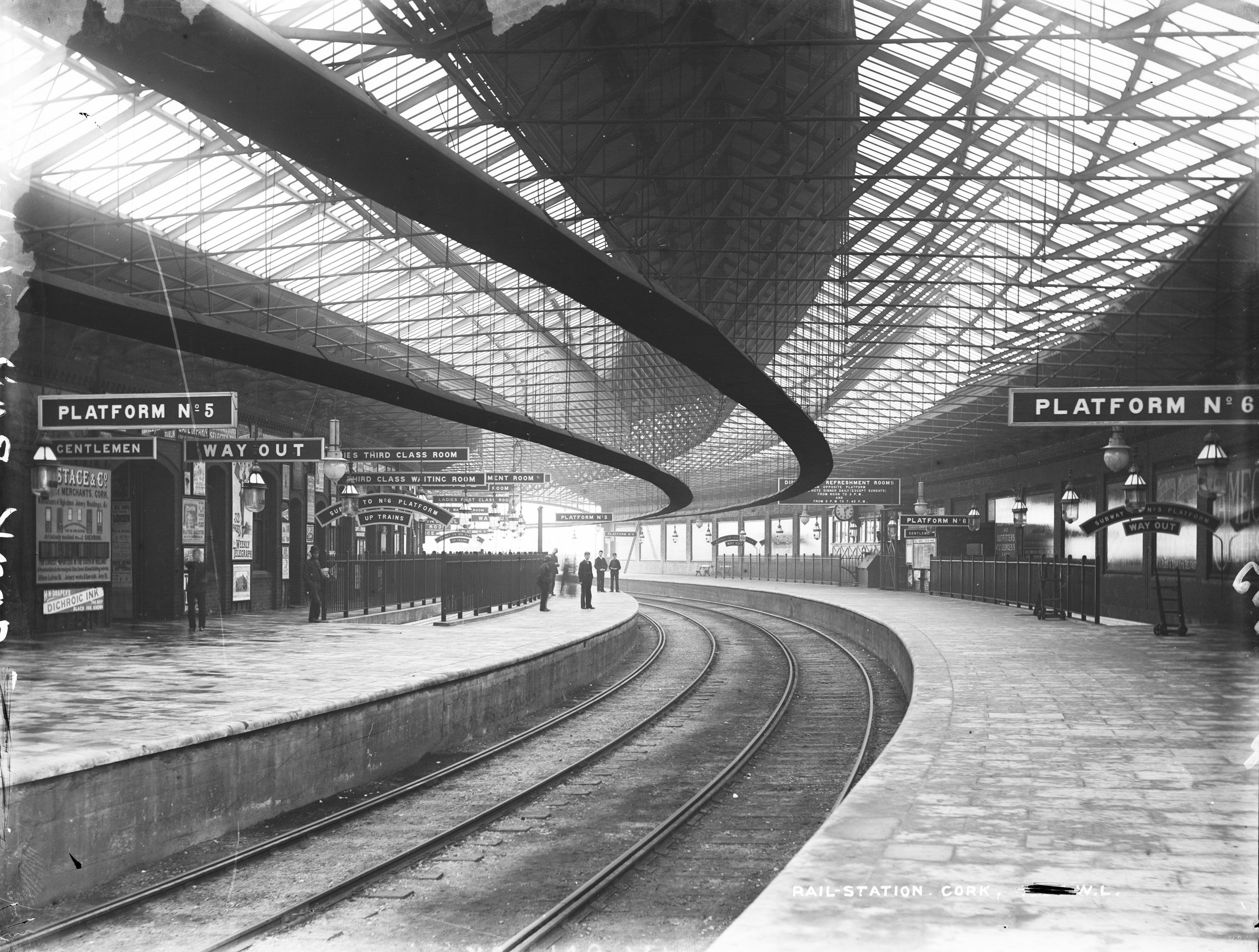
Glanmire Road Station (now called Kent Station) c. 1890

Other rail routes terminating or traversing Cork city were the Cork, Blackrock and Passage Railway, a line to Macroom, the Cork and Muskerry Light Railway to Blarney, Coachford and Donoughmore, as well as the Cork, Bandon and South Coast Railway connecting Bantry, Skibbereen, Clonakilty and many other West Cork towns. West Cork trains terminated at Albert Quay, across the river from Kent Station (though an on-street rail system connected the two for rolling stock and cargo movement). There have been two tram networks in operation Within the city. A proposal to develop a horse-drawn tram (linking the city's railway termini) was made by American George Francis Train in the 1860s and implemented in 1872 by the Cork Tramway Company. However, the company ceased trading in 1875 after Cork Corporation refused permission to extend the line.

In December 1898, the Cork Electric Tramways and Lighting Company began operating on the Blackpool–Douglas, Summerhill–Sunday's Well and Tivoli–Blackrock routes. Increased usage of cars and buses in the 1920s led to a reduction in the use of trams, which discontinued operations permanently on 30 September 1931.

The wider city area, including the city's suburbs, is served by three railway stations. These are Cork Kent railway station, Little Island railway station and Glounthaune railway station.

==== Current routes ====
Cork's Kent Station is the main railway station in the city. From here, Irish Rail services run to destinations all over Ireland. The main line from Cork to Dublin has hourly departures on the half-hour from Cork, and is linked from Limerick Junction with connections to Clonmel and Waterford. InterCity services are also available to Killarney and Tralee, and to Limerick, Ennis, Athenry and Galway (via Limerick Junction and the Limerick to Galway railway line).

The Cork Suburban Rail system also departs from Kent Station and provides connections to parts of Metropolitan Cork. Stations include Little Island, Mallow, Midleton, Fota and Cobh. In July 2009, the Glounthaune to Midleton line was reopened, with new stations at Carrigtwohill and Midleton (and additional stations proposed for Blarney and elsewhere). Little Island railway station serves Cork's Eastern Suburbs.

== Education ==
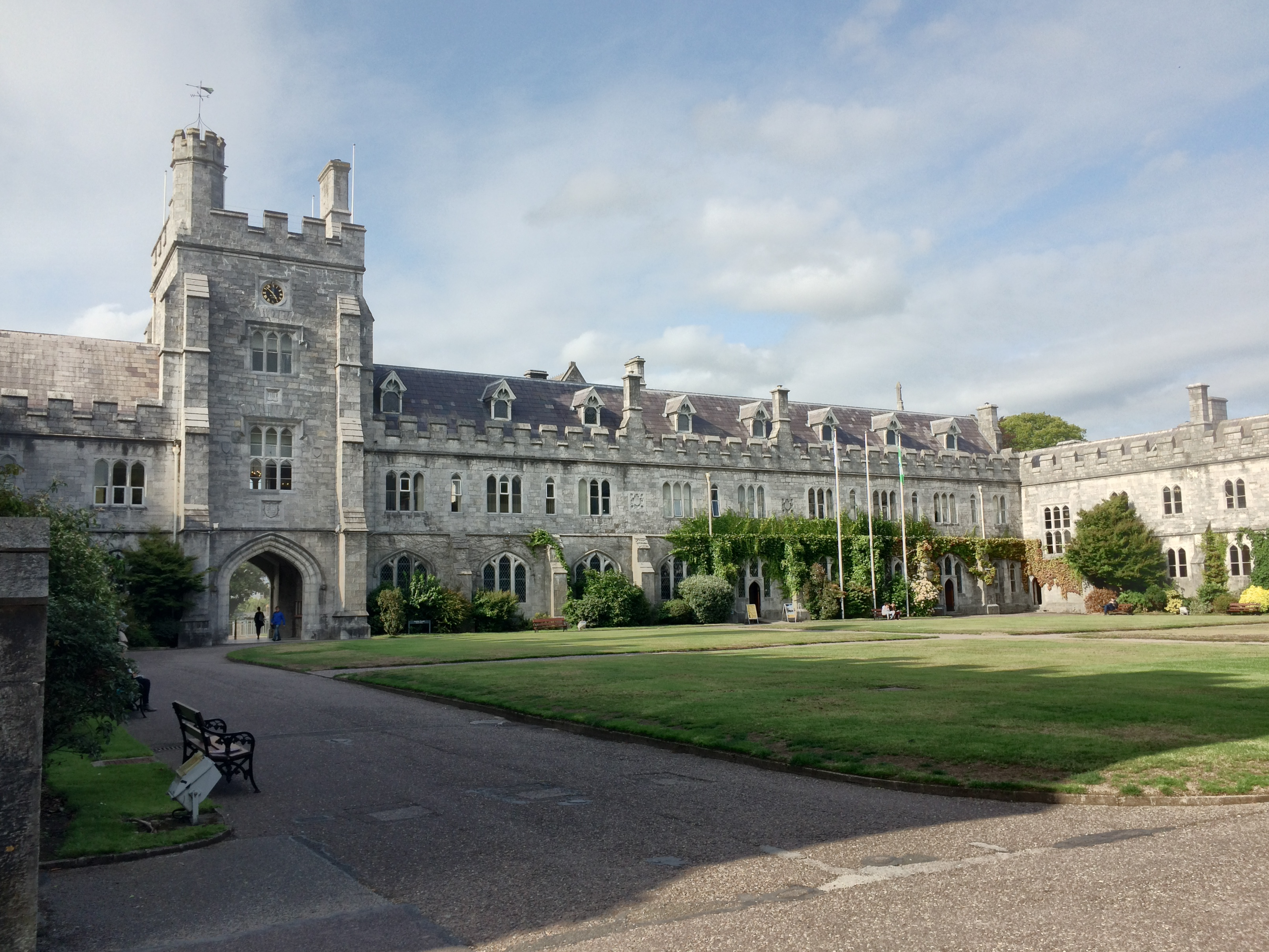
The Quad at University College Cork

Cork is an important educational centre in Ireland—there are more than 35,000 third-level students in the city, meaning the city has a higher ratio of students in the population than the national average. More than 10% of the population of the Metropolitan area are students in University College Cork (UCC) and Munster Technological University, (MTU), including nearly 3,000 international students from more than 100 countries. UCC is a constituent university of the National University of Ireland and offers courses in arts, commerce, engineering, law, medicine and science. It has been named "Irish University of the Year" four times since 2003, most recently in 2016. Munster Technological University (MTU)—formerly Cork Institute of Technology (CIT)—was named Irish "Institute of Technology of the Year" in 2007, 2010 and 2016 and offers third-level courses in Computing and IT, Business, Humanities and Engineering (Mechanical, Electronic, Electrical, and Chemical).

The National Maritime College of Ireland is located in Cork and is the only Irish college in which Nautical Studies and Marine Engineering can be undertaken. MTU incorporates the Cork School of Music and Crawford College of Art and Design as constituent schools. The Cork College of Commerce is the largest college of further education in Ireland. Other third-level institutions include Griffith College Cork, a private institution, and various other colleges.

Research institutes linked to the third-level colleges in the city support the research and innovation capacity of the city and region. Examples include the Tyndall National Institute (ICT hardware research), IMERC (Marine Energy), Environmental Research Institute, NIMBUS (Network Embedded Systems); and CREATE (Advanced Therapeutic Engineering). UCC and CIT also have start-up company incubation centres. At UCC, the IGNITE Graduate Business Innovation Centre aims to foster and support entrepreneurship. In CIT, The Rubicon Centre is a business innovation hub that is home to 57 knowledge-based start-up companies.

== Sport ==
Rugby, Gaelic football, hurling and association football are popular sporting pastimes for Corkonians.

=== Gaelic games ===
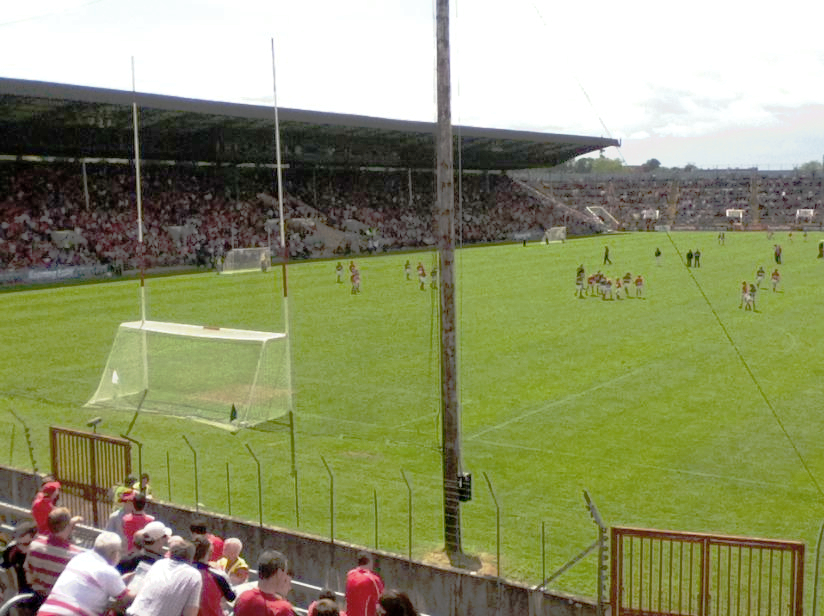
Spectators watch Cork take on Kerry at the Páirc Uí Chaoimh in the city (since redeveloped).

Hurling and football are the most popular spectator sports in the city. Hurling has a strong identity with city and county—with Cork winning 30 All-Ireland Championships. Gaelic football is also popular, and Cork has won seven All-Ireland Senior Football Championship titles. Cork is the only county that has won both championships at least seven times and the only one that has won both in the 21st century. There are many Gaelic Athletic Association clubs in Cork City, including Blackrock National Hurling Club, St. Finbarr's, Glen Rovers, Na Piarsaigh, Nemo Rangers and Douglas GAA. The main public venues are Páirc Uí Chaoimh and Páirc Uí Rinn (named after the noted Glen Rovers player Christy Ring). Camogie (women's hurling) and women's Gaelic football are increasing in popularity.

=== Association football ===
Cork City F.C. are the largest and most successful association football team in Cork, winning three League of Ireland titles, four FAI Cup titles, and one "All Ireland" Setanta Sports Cup title. They play their home games on the south side of the city in Turners Cross. Several, now defunct, Cork clubs played in the League of Ireland before 1984. In total, teams from the city have won the league 12 times. Association football is also played by amateur and school clubs across the city, as well as in "five-a-side"-style leagues.

=== Rugby ===
Rugby union is played at various levels, from school to senior league level. There are two first-division clubs in Cork city. Cork Constitution (five-time All Ireland League Champions) play their home games in Ballintemple and Dolphin R.F.C. play at home in Musgrave Park. Other notable rugby clubs in the city include Highfield, Sunday's Well and UCC. At the school level, Christian Brothers College and Presentation Brothers College are two of the country's better-known rugby nurseries.

Munster Rugby plays a number of its home matches in the Pro14 at Musgrave Park in Ballyphehane. In the past Heineken Cup matches have also been played at Musgrave Park, but most of these are now played at Thomond Park in Limerick. In May 2006 and again in May 2008, Munster became the Heineken Cup champions, with many players hailing from Cork city and county.

=== Water sports ===
There are a variety of watersports in Cork, including rowing and sailing. There are five rowing clubs training on the river Lee, including Shandon BC, UCC RC, Pres RC, Lee RC, and Cork BC. Naomhóga Chorcaí is a rowing club whose members row traditional naomhóga on the Lee in occasional competitions. The "Ocean to City" race has been held annually since 2005 and attracts teams and boats from local and visiting clubs who row the 24 kilometres (15 mi) from Crosshaven into Cork city centre. The National Rowing Center was moved to Inniscarra—approximately 12 km outside the city centre—in 2007. Cork's maritime sailing heritage is maintained through its sailing clubs. The Royal Cork Yacht Club located in Crosshaven (outside the city) is the world's oldest yacht club, and "Cork Week" is a notable sailing event.

=== Cricket ===
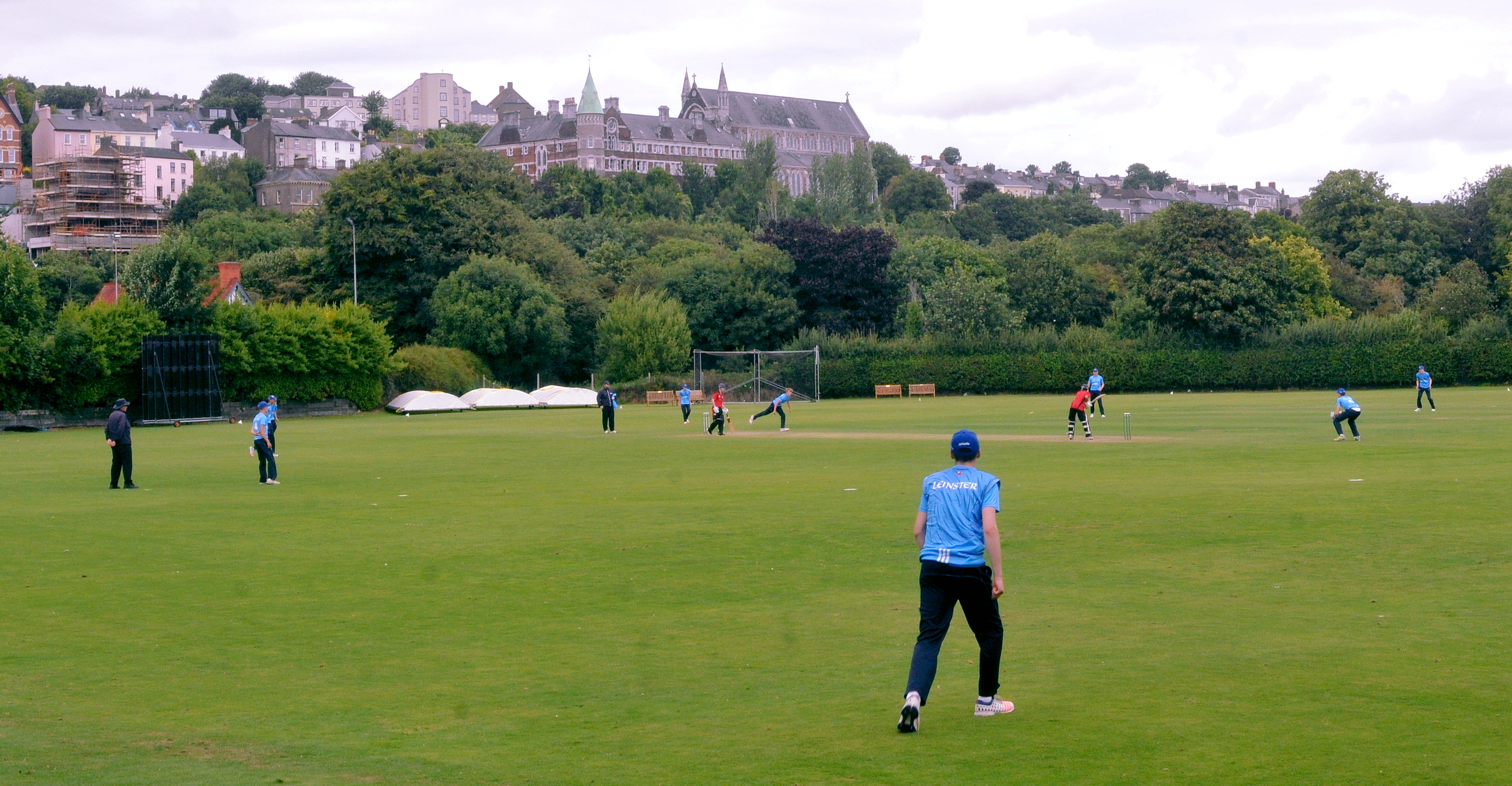
Mardyke, the home of Cork County Cricket Club

The most notable cricket club in Cork is Cork County Cricket Club, which was formed in 1874. Although located within the Munster jurisdiction, the club plays in the Leinster Senior League. The club plays at the Mardyke, a ground which has hosted three first-class matches in 1947, 1961 and 1973. All three involved Ireland playing Scotland. The Cork Cricket Academy operates within the city, with the stated aim of introducing the sport to schools in the city and county. Cork's other main cricket club, Harlequins Cricket Club, play close to Cork Airport. The provincial representative side, the Munster Reds, plays its home matches in the Twenty20 Inter-Provincial Trophy at the Mardyke Cricket Ground.

=== Other sports ===
The city contains clubs active in national competitions in basketball (Neptune and UCC Demons), American football (Cork Admirals) and inline hockey. There are also a number of golf, pitch and putt, hockey, tennis and athletics clubs in the Cork area.

The area is the home of road bowling, which is played in some outer northern and southwestern suburbs. There are boxing and martial arts clubs within the city. Cork Racing, a motorsport team based in Cork, has raced in the Irish Formula Ford Championship since 2005. Cork also hosts one of Ireland's most successful Australian rules football teams, the Leeside Lions, who have won the Australian Rules Football League of Ireland premiership several times.

== Twin cities ==
Cork is twinned with Cologne, Coventry, Rennes, San Francisco, Swansea and Shanghai. As of February 2017, the city council was also in talks to twin with Bordeaux, Saint Petersburg and Miami.

== Demographics ==
Historical population
Year	Pop.	±%
1659	4,826	—
1813	64,394	+1234.3%
1821	100,658	+56.3%
1831	107,016	+6.3%
1841	80,720	−24.6%
1851	82,625	+2.4%
1861	79,594	−3.7%
1871	78,642	−1.2%
1881	80,124	+1.9%
1891	75,345	−6.0%
1901	76,122	+1.0%
1911	76,673	+0.7%
1926	78,490	+2.4%
1936	93,322	+18.9%
1946	89,877	−3.7%
1951	112,009	+24.6%
1956	114,428	+2.2%
1961	115,689	+1.1%
1966	125,283	+8.3%
1971	134,430	+7.3%
1979	138,267	+2.9%
1981	136,344	−1.4%
1986	133,271	−2.3%
1991	127,253	−4.5%
1996	127,187	−0.1%
2002	123,062	−3.2%
2006	119,418	−3.0%
2011	119,230	−0.2%
2016	125,657	+5.4%
2019	210,000	+67.1%
2022	224,004	+6.7%

The population of Cork City and its suburbs was recorded as 208,669 by the 2016 census of Ireland, with in excess of 300,000 in the Metropolitan Cork area. Following the 2019 boundary extension, final results for the city from the 2022 census showed a population of 224,004 people.

Main immigrant groups (2011)
Nationality	Population
Poland	6,822
United Kingdom	3,075
Lithuania	1,126
France	960
Germany	866
India	824
Nigeria	640
Hungary	543
Slovakia	523
Spain	520

There were 119,230 people present in the Cork City Council-administered area at the time of the 2011 census, of these 117,221 indicated that they were usually present in Cork. In common with other Irish urban centres, the female population (50.67%) was higher than the male population (49.33%), although the gap is somewhat smaller than in other cities.

In the 2011 census, of those usually resident, 100,901 (86.08%) were Irish citizens; 10,295 (8.78%) were citizens of other EU countries; 4,316 (3.68%) were citizens of countries elsewhere in the world; 1,709 (1.46%) did not state their citizenship. By the 2016 census, the population of the city and suburbs were 81% white Irish, 10% other white, 1.4% black/black Irish, 2.5% Asian/Asian Irish, 1.7% other, with 2.6% not stating an ethnicity.

By the 2022 census, the population of the city and suburbs were 74.4% white Irish, 9.9% other white, 1.47% black/black Irish, 4.1% Asian/Asian Irish, 2.3% other, with 7.1% not stating an ethnicity

In terms of religion, the 2016 population was 76.4% Catholic, 8.1% other stated religion, with 12.8% having no religion and 2.7% not stated. In the 2011 and 2016 censuses, Roman Catholicism was the most common religion in the city overall, followed by Anglicanism, Presbyterianism and Islam. As of the 2016 census, an increasing number of residents (15%) indicated that they had no religion—a higher rate of increase and a higher overall percentage than the national average (10%). By the 2022 census, Catholics represented 65% of the population, 9% were other religions and 26% either had no religion or stated no religion. While Cork saw some Jewish immigration from Eastern Europe in the 19th century, with second-generation immigrants like Gerald Goldberg holding public office, the community later declined and the synagogue closed. Later immigrant communities retain their places of worship.
