= Wilton Shopping Centre =

Shopping centre in the suburbs of Cork, Ireland

Coordinates: 51.88°N 8.508°W

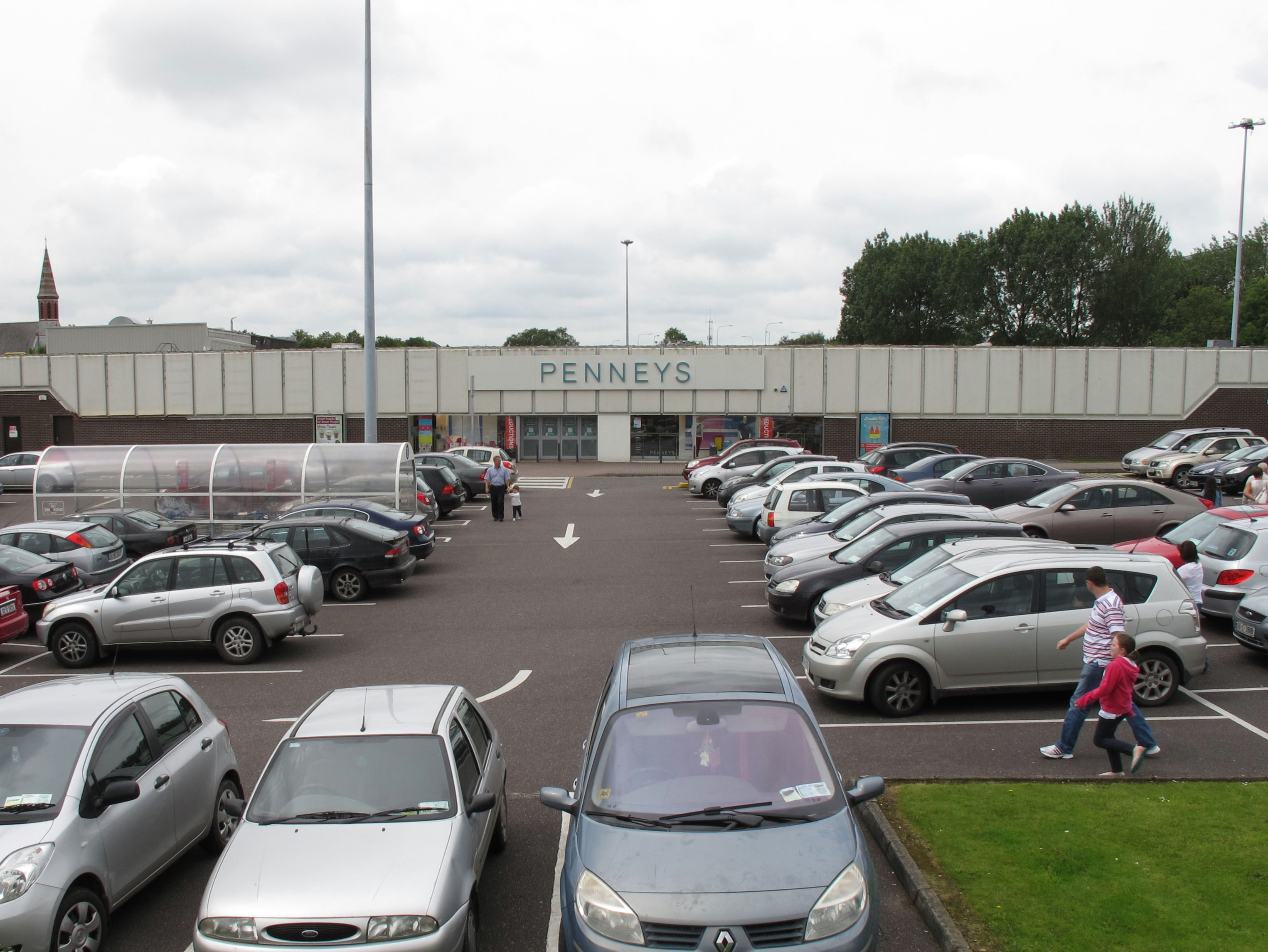
Wilton Shopping Centre car park

Wilton Shopping Centre, located in the Wilton area of Cork, is the second biggest shopping centre in the city. It opened on 6 December 1979, and has 65 shops.

In 2003, construction began to add 10 new units, and outlets in the centre now include Tesco, Penneys, New Look, Life Style Sports, and Easons.

Permission to build a library on the shopping centre grounds was granted in 2004, and Bishopstown Library was opened in 2006. Other facilities adjacent to Wilton Shopping Centre include St Joseph's (S.M.A. Wilton) Catholic Church, Ulster Bank and Bank of Ireland branches, and the Wilton Bar and Restaurant.
