= Izz Cafe =

Palestinian restaurant

Restaurant information
- Established: 2019
- Owner(s): Eman Aburabi, Izzedeen Alkarajeh
- Food type: Palestinian
- Location: Cork, Ireland
- Website: https://izz.ie

Izz Cafe is a Palestinian restaurant in Cork, Ireland, run by couple Eman Aburabi and Izzedeen Alkarajeh.

== Background ==
After Alkarajeh's work permit expired, they moved to Cork, Ireland from Saudi Arabia in 2016, where Alkarajeh was working as a software engineer. As Alkarajeh is Palestinian and Aburabi has Jordanian citizenship, the couple could not live in either country. After arriving in Ireland, they along with their four children, spent fourteen months in direct provision.

They opened a stall at a farmers' market, with the assistance of Darina Allen, who advised them on what Palestinian food would be suited for an Irish palate. On their first day trading, they sold all their stock within two hours. The couple won a "Cork Person of the Month" award in September 2020.

== Restaurant ==
In 2019, the couple opened a brick-and-mortar restaurant on George's Quay in Cork. In 2023, they expanded the restaurant into a neighbouring premises.

Since the beginning of the Gaza genocide in 2023, Izz Cafe have taken part in several fundraisers for support and aid for Gazans. In November 2023, they donated proceeds of sales to the Human Appeal charity. Aburabi is also one of the organisers of Coffee for Palestine, in which businesses pledged the cost of 10 coffees a day to raise money for communities in Gaza.

Izz Café won the 'Best Middle Eastern' prize, at the Just Eat Awards, in 2024.

In February 2025, the Irish rap group, Kneecap, visited the restaurant when they were in the city for a gig.

== Book ==
In July 2025, Aburabi and Alkarajeh launched a cookbook in association with Blasta Books. The book, Jibrin, is named after the Aburabi family's hometown of Bayt Jibrin.
