= Carrigtwohill =

Town in County Cork, Ireland

Carrigtohill Carraig Thuathail
- Town
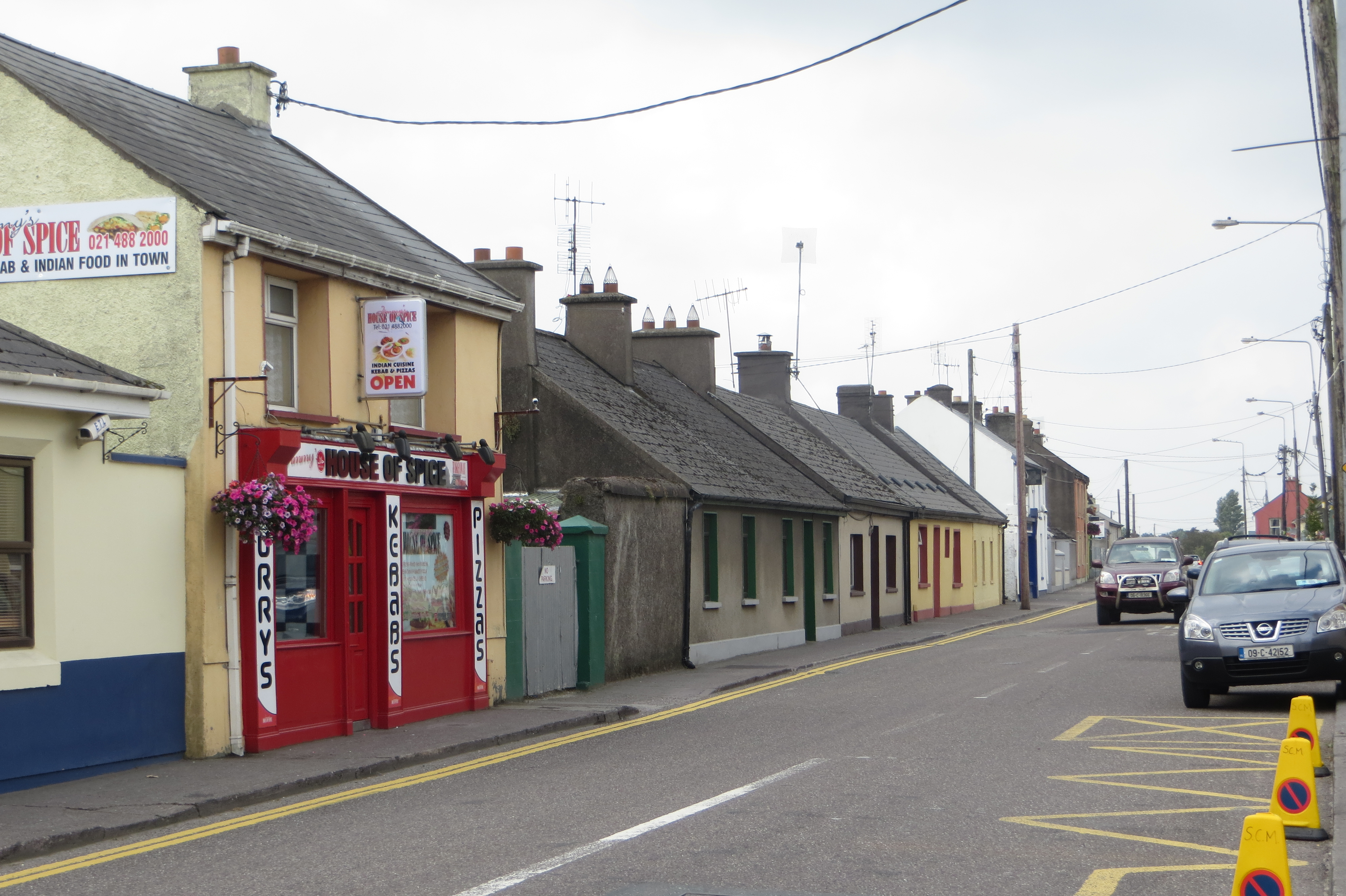
- Main Street
- Nickname: Carrig
- Location in Ireland
- Coordinates: 51°54′34″N 8°15′26″W
- Country: Ireland
- Province: Munster
- County: County Cork

Area
  - Total: 1.5 km^{2} (0.58 sq mi)
- Elevation: 10 m (33 ft)

Population (2022)
  - Total: 5,568
- Irish Grid Reference: W819728
- Website: carrigtwohillcommunity.ie

Historical population
Year	Pop.	±%
1841	692	—
1851	885	+27.9%
1861	826	−6.7%
1871	700	−15.3%
1881	809	+15.6%
1891	489	−39.6%
1901	490	+0.2%
1911	461	−5.9%
1926	364	−21.0%
1936	402	+10.4%
1946	399	−0.7%
1951	388	−2.8%
1956	430	+10.8%
1961	407	−5.3%
1966	473	+16.2%
1981	1,198	+153.3%
1986	1,272	+6.2%
1991	1,212	−4.7%
1996	1,232	+1.7%
2002	1,411	+14.5%
2006	2,782	+97.2%
2011	4,551	+63.6%
2016	5,080	+11.6%
2022	5,568	+9.6%

Carrigtwohill, officially Carrigtohill /ˌkærɪɡˈtuːhɪl/ (Irish: Carraig Thuathail, meaning 'Tuathal's rock'), is a town in County Cork, Ireland with a population of 5,568 (2022). It is 12 kilometres east of Cork city centre. It is connected to Cork Suburban Rail and is bypassed by the N25 road. Carrigtwohill is one of the fastest-growing towns in the region, and a hub for pharmaceutical and biotechnology companies. The town is in the civil parish of Carrigtohill. Carrigtwohill is part of the Cork East Dáil constituency.

== Name ==
It is generally believed that the town's name is from Irish: Carraig Thuathail, meaning 'Tuathal's rock'. However, in his book Church and Parish Records (1903), the Rev. J.H. Cole of the Church of Ireland said that tuathail is used in the sense of "left-handed", or "North". Cole says it is so called because, whereas most of the rocks in that part of the country run east–west, the rocks at Carrigtwohill run north–south.

The town's anglicised name first appeared in written documents in 1234 as Karrectochell. Later spellings include Carrigtuoghill, Carrigtoghill, Carrigtowhill and Carrigtowill.

== Places of interest ==
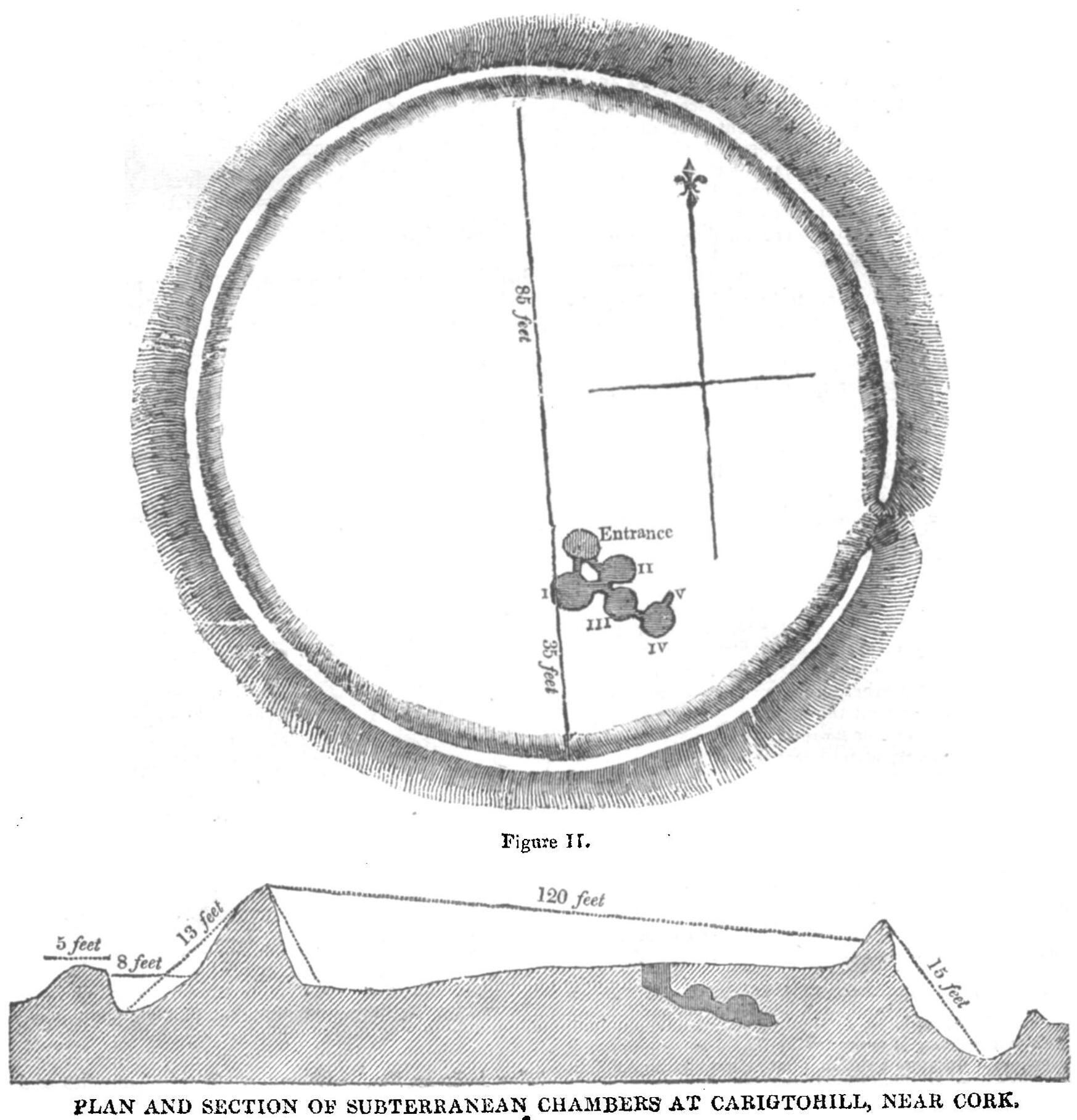
Plan and section of Subterranean Chambers at Woodstock, Carrigtohill. Dublin Penny Journal, 1835

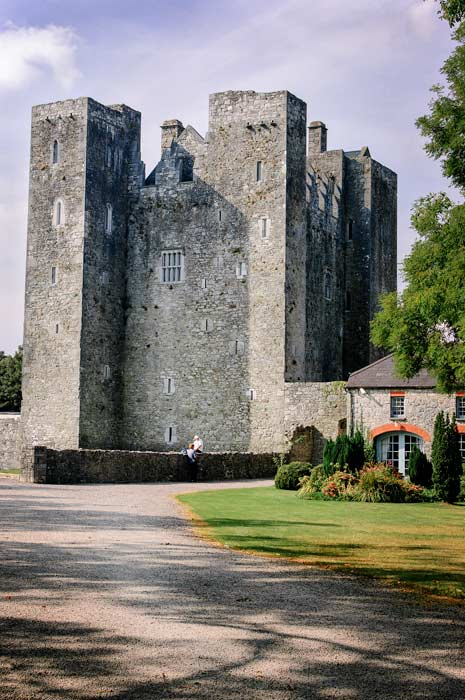
Barryscourt Castle near Carrigtwohill

The huge rock from which Carrigtwohill derives its name is about half a mile north-eastwards of the town itself, and is in the townland of Carrigane. The rock is honeycombed with caves; some are large and extend for miles underground where stalactites are to be found. Tradition has it that a goat once entered one of these caves, emerging in the townland of Ballintubrid, a few miles southwards. The cave where the goat emerged is called Poll an Ghabhair, meaning The Goat's Hole.

The town is the home of Barryscourt Castle. The castle was originally built in the 12th century and rebuilt in the 16th century. It was refurbished between 1991 and 2006, and tours of the castle are held during the summer months.

Fota Island is also located close to Carrigtwohill. This island is home to Ireland's only wildlife park, Fota Wildlife Park, and also the restored Fota House and Arboretum. Fota Island Resort includes the 5 star Fota Island Hotel, as well as two championship golf courses, on which the Irish Open was played in 2001, 2002 and 2014.

Ireland's first permanent drive-in cinema, "Movie Junction", was located to the west of the town. Opened in November 2010, it closed in 2019.

The biggest agricultural show in Ireland, the National Ploughing Championships took place to the east of the village in 1992. The three-day event attracted almost 180,000 people.

== Economy ==
A number of multinational corporations have premises in the IDA Business Park to the west of the town, including GE Healthcare, Stryker, Merck Millipore, Abbvie and Gilead Sciences. In October 2007, the biotechnology giant Amgen scrapped its partially constructed plant at Ballyadam on the outskirts of Carrigtwohill.

Supermarket chain Aldi has a presence in the Castlesquare retail development.

== Demographics ==
As of the 2016 census, Carrigtwohill had a population of 5,080 (2,510/49.4% were male, 2,570/50.6% were female), of which 68% were white Irish, less than 1% Irish traveller, 19% other white, 6% black, 2% Asian, 1% other, while 3% had not stated an ethnic background. In terms of religion, the area was 79% Catholic, 10% other stated religion, 8% no religion, and 3% not stated religion.

== Transport ==
=== Rail ===
Carrigtwohill railway station is a station on the Cork Suburban Rail service between Midleton and Cork city. Passengers for Cobh change at Glounthaune. A second station, Carrigtwohill West, was proposed to serve the west of the town, but was not progressed.

The original Carrigtwohill railway station was opened on 2 November 1859, closed for goods traffic on 2 December 1974 and fully closed from 6 September 1976. A new station was officially opened on 30 July 2009 on the north of the town, with Park n' Ride facilities for commuters travelling to Cork City.

=== Bus ===
Carrigtwohill is covered by bus services, including route 261 from Cork to Midleton. Carrigtwohill is also served by bus routes 240, 241 and 260 with connections to Youghal, Whitegate, Cloyne, Ballycotton and Ardmore.

== Sport ==
The local Gaelic Athletic Association (GAA) club, Carrigtwohill GAA, has facilities including a modern gymnasium and three playing pitches - two of which are floodlit. The club has a senior hurling team, having won the Cork Premier Intermediate Hurling Championship in 2007. In 2011, Carrigtwohill won the Cork Senior Hurling Championship for the first time since 1918.

There is also a soccer club, Carrigtwohill United AFC, which plays at Ballyadam, to the North East of the town. They have several pitches and dressing rooms at Ballyadam.

Other sports clubs in Carrigtwohill include Glenmary Basketball Club, Carrigtwohill Badminton Club, an athletics club, a taekwondo club and a tennis club. There is also a padel tennis facility at the Fota Junction Retail Park.

== Notable people ==
- William Gerard Barry - a painter who studied at the Académie Julian in Paris. He was killed in France during WW2 by a bomb exploding near his home in France.
- Dáibhí de Barra - farmer, poet and writer in the Irish language.
- Dáibhí Ó Bruadair - Irish language poet from the Carrigtwohill area
- Gerald Heard - British writer who spent some of his childhood in his grandmother's home near Carrigtwohill
- Ailis McSweeney - athlete and sprinter
- Niall McCarthy - inter-county hurler
- Willie John Daly - inter-county hurler
- Dominic McGlinchey - at one time the 'most wanted man in Ireland' was found hiding in Carrigtwohill
