= Cork Greenway =

Walking trails in County Cork, Ireland

County Cork has a number of rail-trails and greenways and, as of 2022, there are plans and proposals at various stages of preparation to create a network of walking trails for the county. The term "Cork Greenway" has been used in press coverage, but is not used officially.

== Midleton — Youghal rail trail ==
In July 2015, Irish Rail indicated they had no intention of re-opening the Midleton to Youghal section of the Cork and Youghal Railway as funds would be better spent on the existing network. They indicated support for a greenway, as it would free them from existing maintenance costs whilst retaining a license to re-open the route in the event that became an option. By April 2020, a €15 million euro project to open the Midleton to Youghal Greenway had begun but was being delayed by the COVID-19 pandemic. The proposed trail would measure 23 kilometres.

The first section of the greenway was opened in March 2024. The trailheads, for the initial 8 kilometres (5.0 mi) stretch, are Midleton and Mogeely, with construction due to be complete on the whole trail by the end of 2024. Killeagh is also due to be part of the route.

In July 2024, Dáil deputy David Stanton proposed that one side of the disused line be used as a bus corridor.

== Mallow — Fermoy — Dungarvan ==
In 2022, the possibility of linking Mallow to the existing Waterford Greenway and Suir blueway was examined.

== Cork Harbour Greenway ==
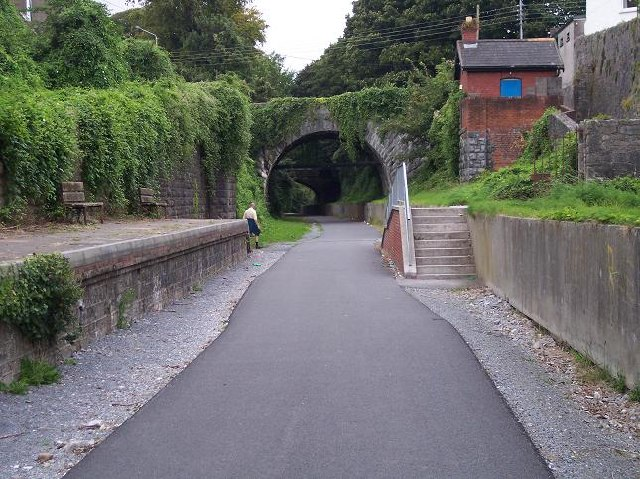
Path near former Blackrock station

The Cork Harbour Greenway runs from Páirc Uí Chaoimh stadium to Passage West, along the route of the former Cork Electric Tramways and Lighting Company Blackpool — Cork tram line, and Cork, Blackrock and Passage Railway.
