= Little Island railway station =

Railway station in Little Island, County Cork, Ireland

Little Island An tOileán Beag
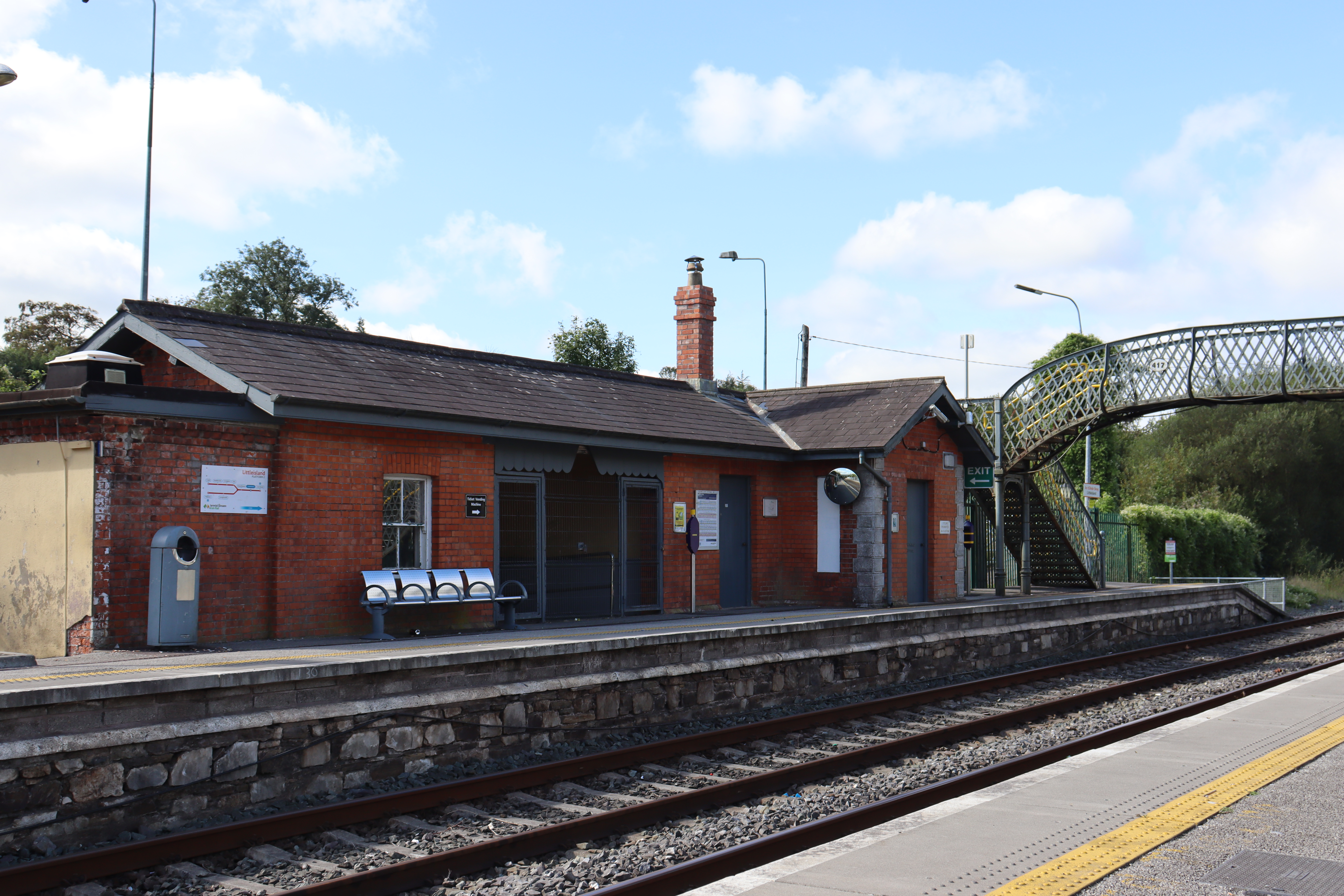

General information
- Location: Island Cross, Little Island; County Cork; Ireland
- Coordinates: 51.9078°N 8.35466°W
- Owner: Iarnród Éireann
- Platforms: 2
- Tracks: 2
- Bus operators: Bus Éireann
- Connections: 240; 241; 260; 261

Construction
- Structure type: At-grade
- Parking: Yes
- Accessible: Limited

Other information
- Station code: LSLND (61)

History
- Opened: 10 November 1859
- Original company: Cork and Youghal Railway
- Pre-grouping: Great Southern and Western Railway
- Post-grouping: Great Southern Railways

Services
| Preceding station | Iarnród Éireann | Following station |
|---|---|---|
| Cork Kent Terminus | Commuter Cork–Cobh | Glounthaune towards Cobh |
| Cork Kent Terminus | Commuter Cork–Midleton | Glounthaune towards Midleton |
Route map
Location

Little Island railway station (sometimes spelled as Littleisland, which is the name that station signs display) serves the area of Little Island in County Cork.

It is a station on the Cork to Cobh or Midleton commuter service.

== Description ==
The station has no toilets and has no ticket office. The ticket vending machine at the station is on each platform and a leap card system is also available.

A footbridge connects the two platforms, but both platforms have separate ramp access; a roundabout route involving the slip road off the nearby N25 allows passengers step-free access from the car park to the Cork-bound platform.

== History ==
The station opened on 10 November 1859.
