= Dunkettle =

Dunkettle may refer to:

- An area in the east of Cork (city), Ireland
  - Dunkettle Interchange, a major road junction in the area
  - Dunkettle railway station, a former station serving the area
