= Glounthaune railway station =

Station in County Cork, Ireland

Glounthaune Gleanntán
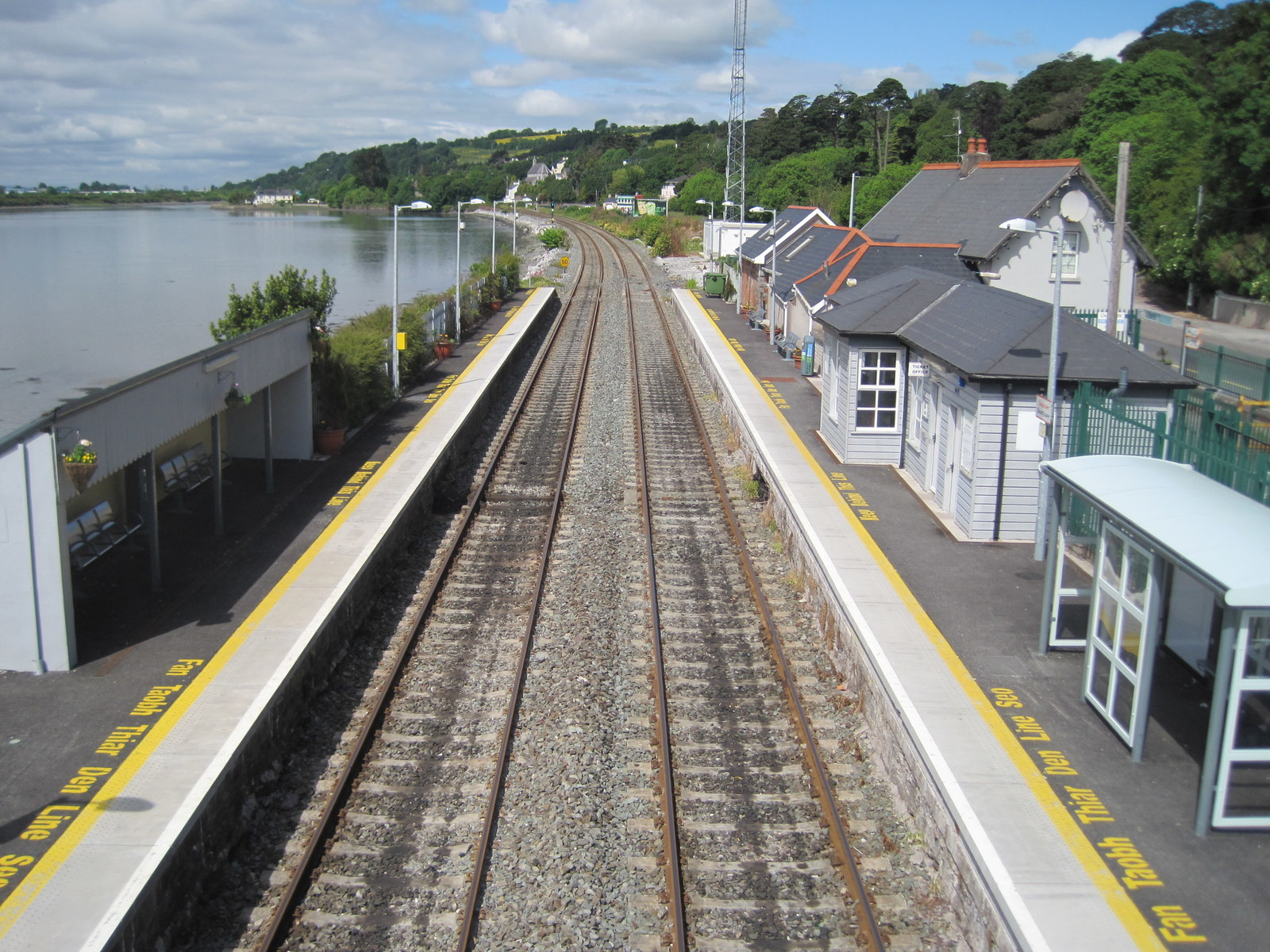
- Station view looking west towards Cork city

General information
- Location: Glounthaune; County Cork; Ireland
- Coordinates: 51°54′40″N 8°19′30″W
- Owner: Iarnród Éireann
- Platforms: 2
- Tracks: 2
- Bus operators: Bus Eireann
- Connections: 240; 241; 260; 261

Construction
- Structure type: At-grade
- Parking: Yes
- Accessible: Limited

Other information
- Station code: GHANE (380)

History
- Opened: 10 November 1859
- Original company: Cork and Youghal Railway
- Pre-grouping: Great Southern and Western Railway
- Post-grouping: Great Southern Railways

Services
Preceding station	Iarnród Éireann	Following station
Little Island towards Cork Kent	Commuter Cork–Cobh	Fota towards Cobh
Little Island towards Cork Kent	Commuter Cork–Midleton	Carrigtwohill towards Midleton
Route map
Location

Glounthaune railway station (Irish: Gleanntán) is an Iarnród Éireann station serving the town of Glounthaune in County Cork, Ireland. The station is at is the junction between Cobh and Midleton on the Cork Commuter line, around a kilometre east of Glounthaune town.

== History ==
The station opened on 10 November 1859 by the Cork, Youghal & Queenstown Railway, with services initially only running onwards to Youghal. On 10 March 1862, passenger services began running to Cobh from the junction as well. The line onward to Midleton and Youghal closed to passenger services in 1963 before re-opening again in August 2009 as far as Midleton The station was originally named "Queenstown Junction" and was renamed first "Cobh Junction" in 1928, and finally "Glounthaune" in 1994; tickets issued from Iarnród Éireann portable ticket machines still print the station name as "Cobh Jct".

== Services ==
The station is unstaffed, with two ticket machines near the entrance in the carpark and two leap card validators (one at the entrance and the other on the platform). There are two platforms serving the double track. Platform 1 is on the near side and is fully wheelchair accessible with eastbound trains from Cork to Cobh and Midleton. There is a footbridge to bring passengers from platform 1 to platform 2 meaning there is no wheelchair access to platform 2 and the westbound trains running to Little Island and Cork city. As of 2020, Cork County Council published plans to add more parking spaces (48 as of January 2020) and to improve accessibility to bicycles and improve onward bus connections in the 2020s.

With around 40 trains per day in each direction, this is a frequent commuter station with four trains per hour running into Cork city at peak time on weekdays and twice per hour (1 from Cobh and 1 from Midleton) off peak. Travel time to Cork:11 minutes, Midleton:13 minutes and Cobh:14 minutes. The station is usually served by IE 2600 Class diesel trains in 2 or 4 carriage setups.

Under the Cork metropolitan area transport strategy, published in 2019, it was planned to increase services to the station and potentially electrify the line by approximately 2040.

== Gallery ==
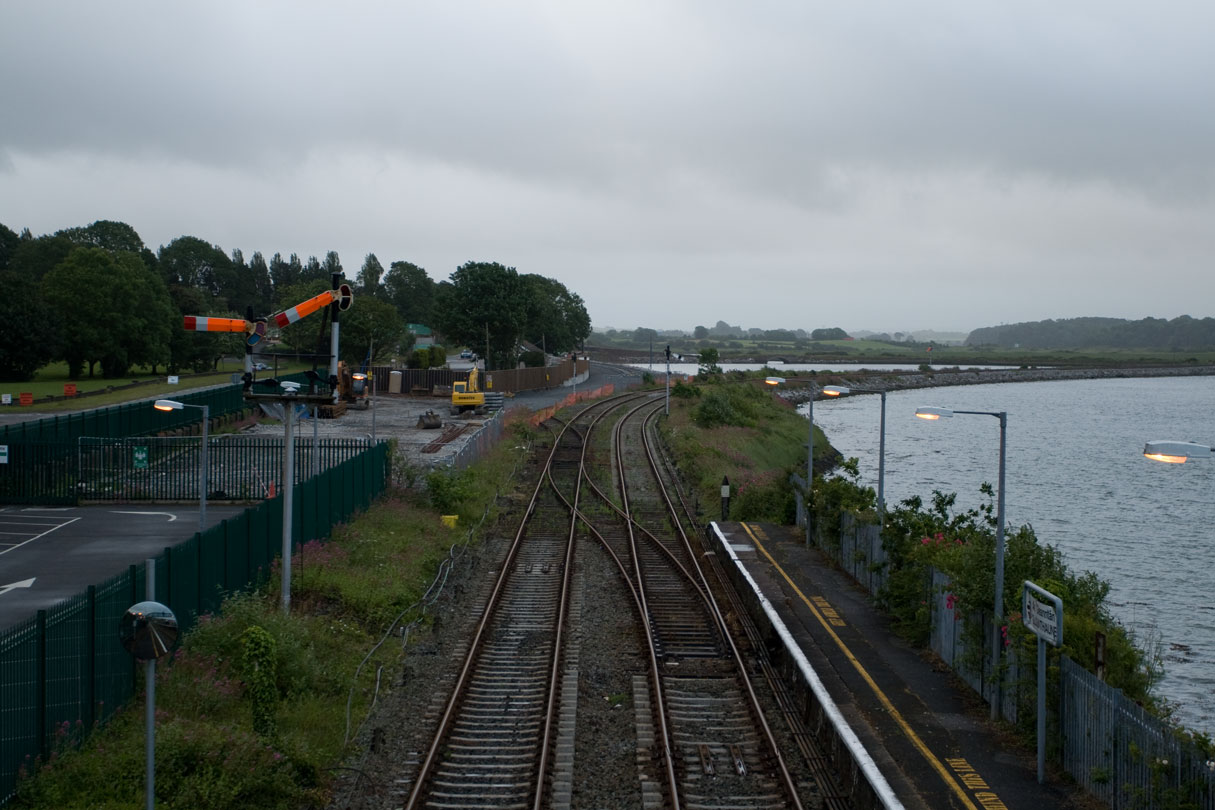
Glounthaune railway station in 2008 before the Midleton line was reopened

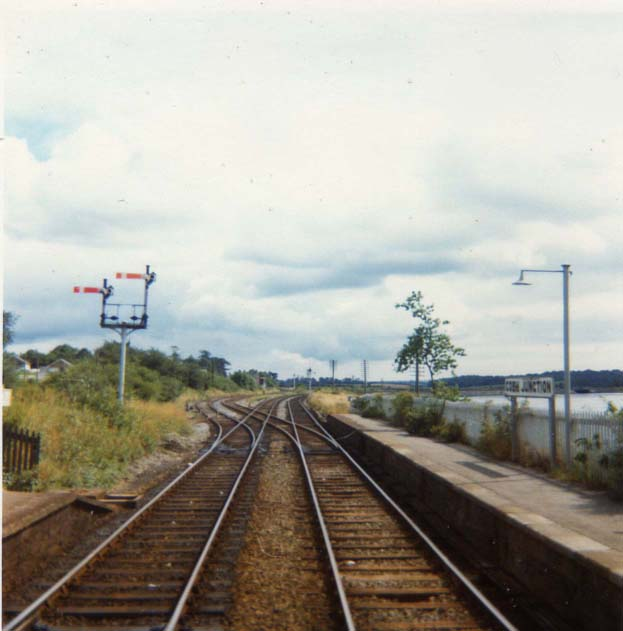
Cobh Junction in 1973 with the line to Youghal on the left.
