= Carrigtwohill railway station =

Railway station in County Cork, Ireland

Carrigtwohill Carraig Thuathail
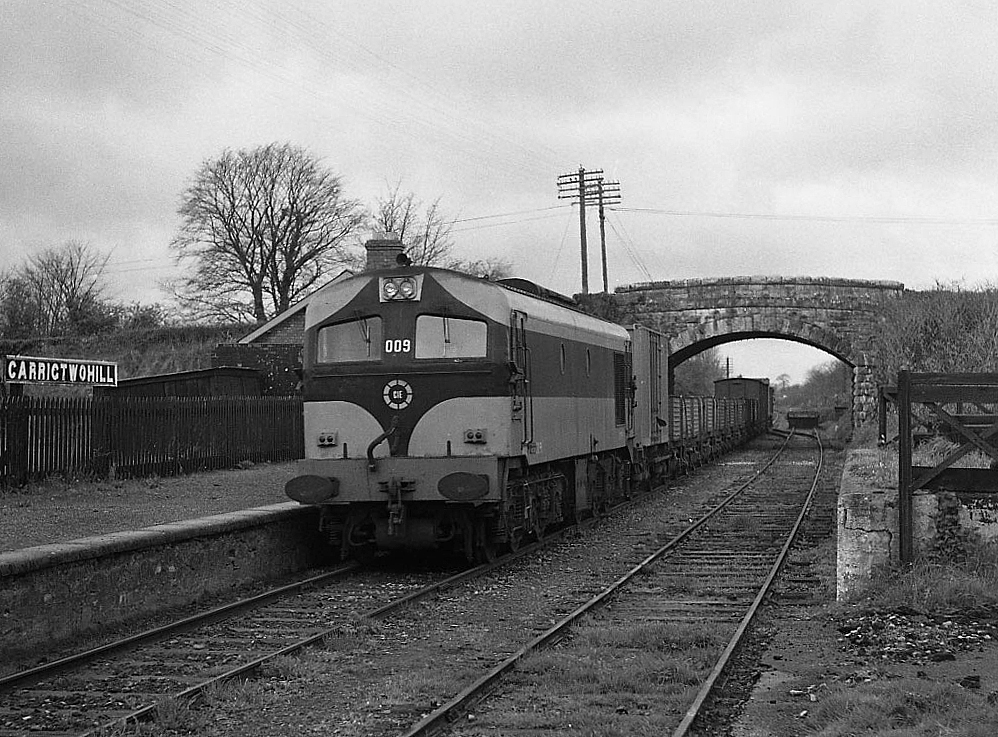
- A freight train passing the station on 27 April 1977, when the station was closed.

General information
- Location: Carrigtwohill, County Cork; Ireland
- Coordinates: 51°55′0″N 8°15′48″W
- Owner: Iarnród Éireann
- Platforms: 2
- Tracks: 2

Construction
- Structure type: At-grade
- Parking: Yes
- Accessible: Yes

Other information
- Station code: CGTWL (67)

History
- Opened: 2 November 1859
- Original company: Cork and Youghal Railway
- Pre-grouping: Great Southern and Western Railway
- Post-grouping: Great Southern Railways

Key dates
- 2 December 1974: Closed to goods
- 6 September 1976: Closed to passengers
- 30 July 2009: Reopened

Services
Preceding station	Iarnród Éireann	Following station
Glounthaune towards Cork Kent	Commuter Cork–Midleton	Midleton Terminus
Route map
Location

Carrigtwohill railway station serves the town of Carrigtwohill in County Cork.

It is a station on the Cork to Midleton commuter service. Passengers to Cobh change at Glounthaune station.

The station is unstaffed but has a ticket vending machine. Its two platforms are both fully accessible.

== History ==
The original station in Carrigtwohill was opened on 2 November 1859, but closed for goods traffic on 2 December 1974 and fully closed on 6 September 1976. It was re-opened on 30 July 2009 as part of the newly refurbished Cork-Midleton line.

== Developments ==
The 2002 Cork Suburban Rail Feasibility Study proposed the construction of a new station approximately 3 miles (4.8 km) west of the existing station. 'Carrigtwohill West' station was proposed to serve an industrial area west of Carrigtwohill, with IDA Ireland providing partial funding. The project was cancelled in 2012.

== See also ==
- List of railway stations in Ireland
