= ZSI =

ZSI can refer to:

- Zentrum für Soziale Innovation, Vienna (Austria)
- Zoological Survey of India, Calcutta (India)
- Zoological Society of Ireland
