= Mogeely =

Village in County Cork, Ireland

Mogeely Maigh Dhíle (Irish)
- Village
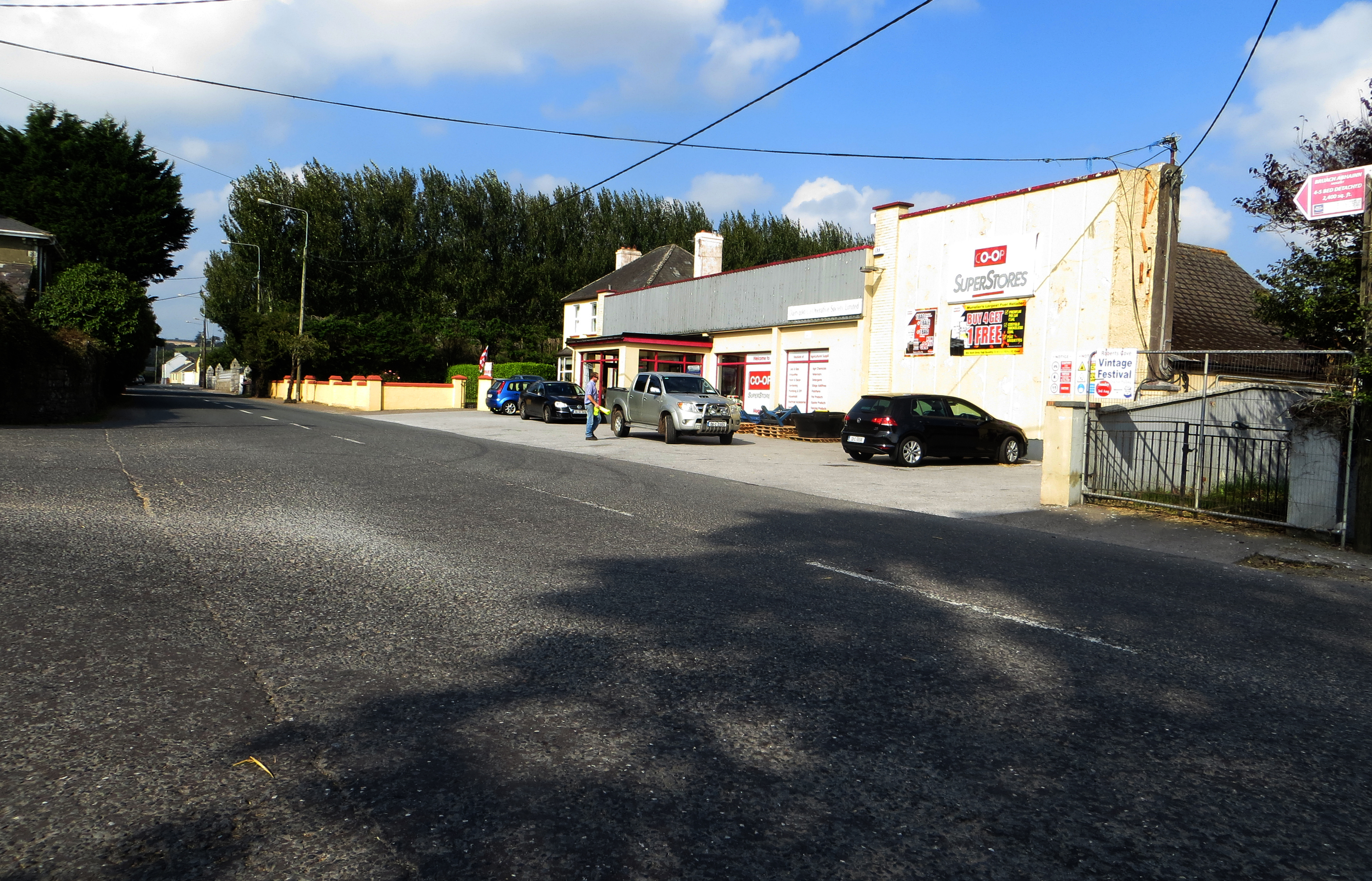
- Dairygold Co-Op store in Mogeely in 2014 (since remodelled)

- Location in Ireland
- Coordinates: 51°55′51″N 8°3′34″W
- Country: Ireland
- Province: Munster
- County: County Cork

Population (2016)
  - Total: 389
- Time zone: UTC+0 (WET)
  - Summer (DST): UTC-1 (IST (WEST))

Mogeely (Irish: Maigh Dhíle) is a village in County Cork, Ireland. As of the 2016 census, it had a population of 389 people. The village is in a townland and civil parish of the same name.

Mogeely lies in east Cork, approximately 2 kilometres (1.2 mi) north of Castlemartyr off the N25 national primary road. Mogeely railway station was, until it closed in the 1970s, a stop on the Cork to Youghal railway line. The nearest train station is now Midleton railway station.

Located within a largely rural area, Mogeely hosted the National Ploughing Championships in 2005. Local employers include the Dairygold Co-Operative Society, which operates two cheese processing plants in the area.

The Pine family, originally English, were the main landowners here from the 1580s to the early 1700s. Henry Pine was granted Mogeely under Queen Elizabeth I, holding it as a tenant of Sir Walter Raleigh. During the serious disturbances in Munster in 1598, he fled back to England, but later returned to Mogeely. His grandson, Sir Richard Pyne, was Lord Chief Justice of Ireland from 1695 to 1709. Their home, Mogeely Castle, no longer exists.
