= Dáibhí de Barra =

Irish writer

Dáibhí de Barra (Dáibhí Do Barra; c. 1758–1851) was a farmer, poet, and author in the Irish language.

Born in Carrigtwohill, County Cork, and received education in the local hedge school. He remained his native district all his life, and he was one of the few who were writing in the Irish language during the early 19th century. He composed exuberantly styled folktales and was able to compose short pieces of devotional prayers for during Mass. He wrote Páirliament na bhFíodóirí (Parliament of Weavers), Corraghliocas na mBan Léirmhúinte (based on Ned Ward's Female Policy Detected), along with a lively account of the Tithe War. This was written as an account of a tithe affray at Rossmore Strand, near Carrightohill. Dáibhí de Barra recast the story of his neighbors' defeat of Royal Irish Constabulary and the redcoats attempting to seize Anglican tithes to make the story read like a heroic saga.
