= Cork Electric Tramways and Lighting Company =

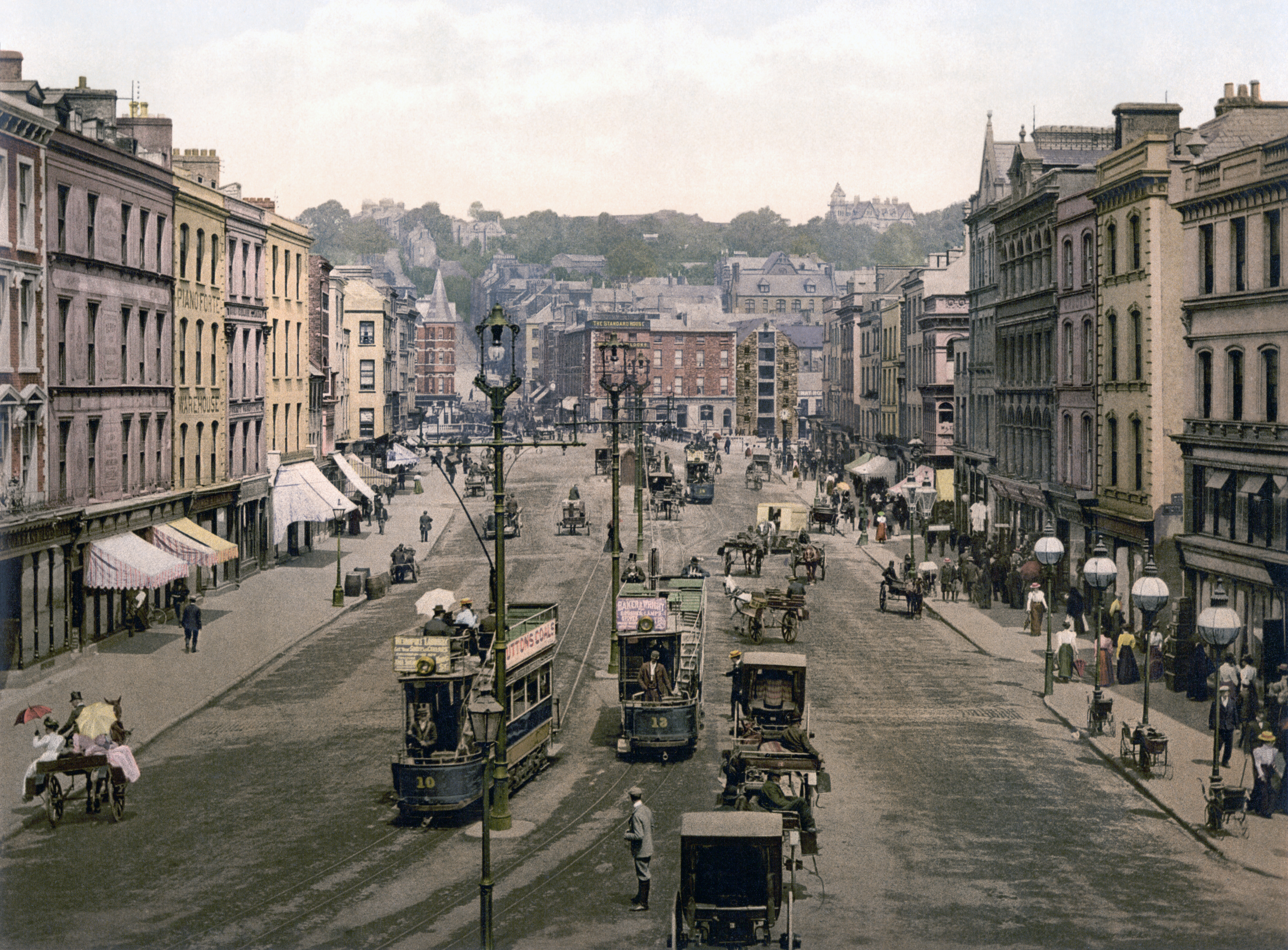
- Patrick Street c. 1900

Operation
- Locale: Cork
- Open: 22 December 1898
- Close: 30 September 1931
- Status: Closed

Infrastructure
- Track gauge: 900 mm (2 ft 11 7/16 in)
- Propulsion system: Electric

Statistics
- Route length: 9.89 miles (15.92 km)

The Cork Electric Tramways and Lighting Company operated a passenger tramway service in Cork between 1898 and 1931.

== History ==
=== Origins ===
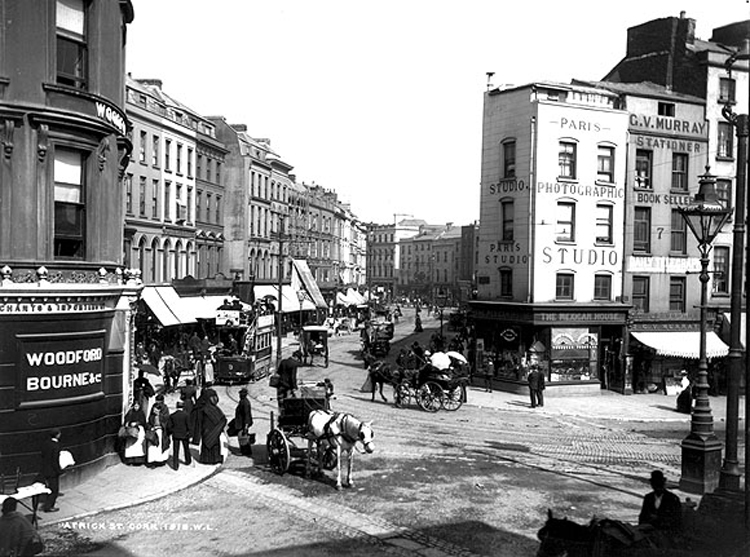
Patrick Street from Daunts Square

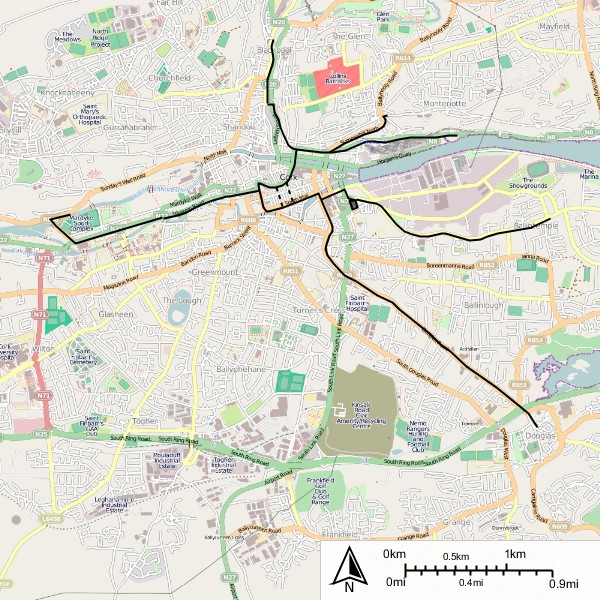
Map of Cork City Electric Tramways

The Cork Electric Tramways and Lighting Company was a subsidiary of British Thomson-Houston, a major electrical contracting company. The contractor for the permanent way was William Martin Murphy, who later became chairman of the company. The power station was built by Edward Fitzgerald (later Sir Edward Fitzgerald, 1st Baronet) and the engineer for the system was Charles Hesterman Merz.

The gauge of the tramway was 900 mm (2 ft 11 7/16 in) gauge, selected to allow trains from the 3 ft (914 mm) narrow gauge Cork and Muskerry Light Railway and the Cork, Blackrock and Passage Railway to connect using the tram lines.

Services started on 22 December 1898, when the company had 17 cars in operation. Over the Christmas period, weekend traffic was heavy and there were some minor accidents and injuries, including some passengers who, having been celebrating Christmas, fell from the tramcars.

=== The Burning of Cork ===
There was substantial disruption to services and destruction of some tramcars during the Burning of Cork in December 1920. The events which occurred to the driver, John Hurley, conductor Alex Garvey and passengers on tramcar no 3 were recorded in the Cork Examiner:

"Passengers by the last tram to St. Luke's Cross, which left the Statue at 9 p.m. on Saturday, had a rather eventful journey. The car had got about 60 or 70 yards beyond Empress Place police barracks when a number of men in police uniform, carrying carbines and accompanied by Auxiliaries in plain clothes, held it up. They ordered all the passengers off at the point of revolvers. Male passengers were somewhat roughly handled and then ordered to line up for search. Some few were inclined to run and a voice rang out: "I'll shoot anyone who runs." All then stopped but some shots were fired in the air while the searches were being conducted. In some cases when the search was completed the person searched was ordered home, getting a bit of a rough send-off. The tramcar was then broken in by the police and a rifle shot was discharged, the smell of powder permeating the air. The tramcar was brought back to the Statue by the driver and conductor who when it neared there were ordered off. It was later set on fire and completely destroyed."

=== Closure ===
The tram operations were permanently discontinued on 30 September 1931, falling victim to the increasing popularity of bus services operated by The Irish Omnibus Company, and the takeover of the tram company's electricity plant by Ireland's Electricity Supply Board (ESB).

== Fleet ==
The company ordered the first 18 tramcars from Brush of Loughborough in 1898. Subsequent orders of 11 in 1900 and 6 in 1901 took the fleet to a maximum of 35. The livery was bright green and cream.

== Routes ==
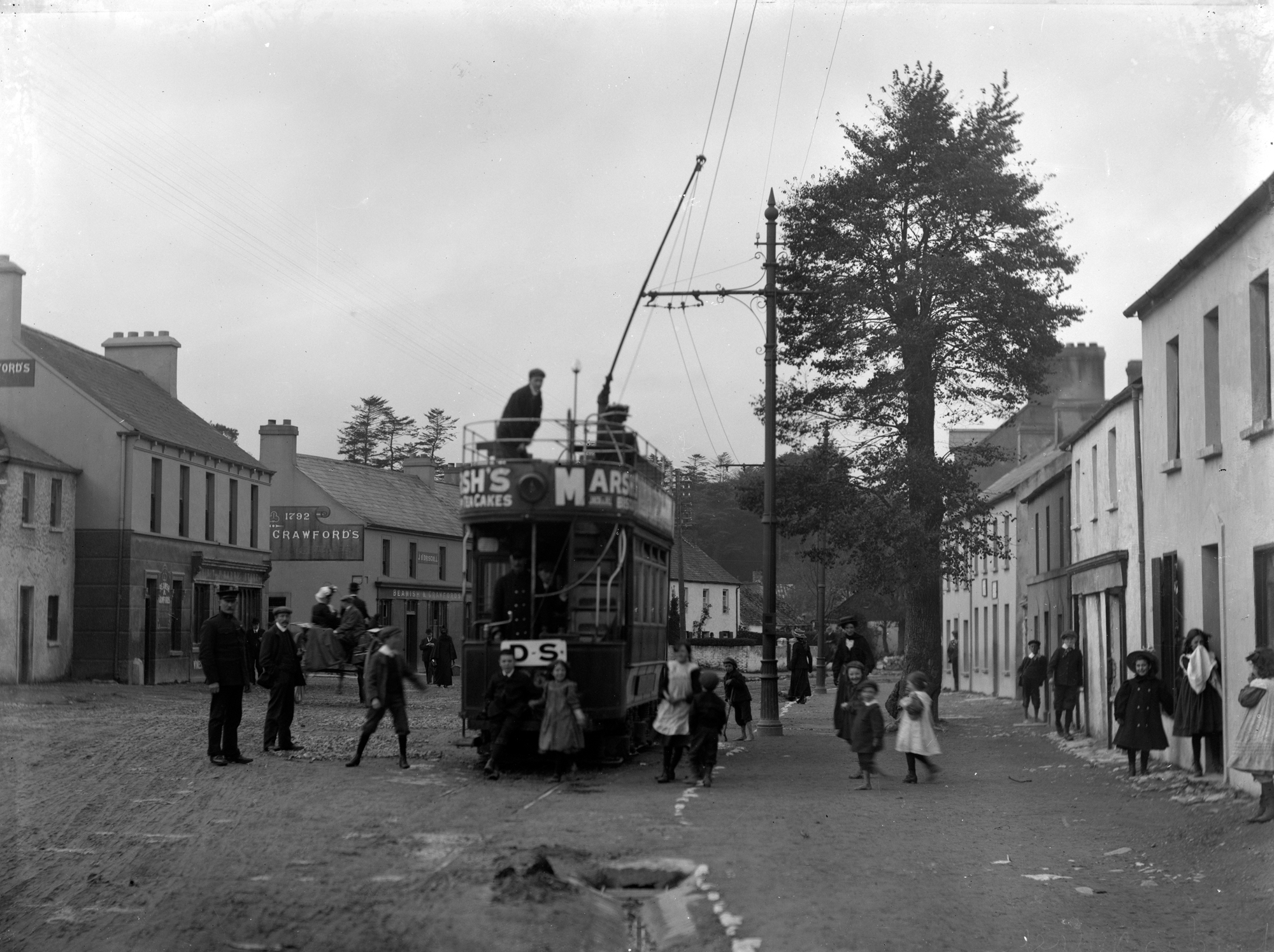
Tram in Douglas at the turn of the 20th century

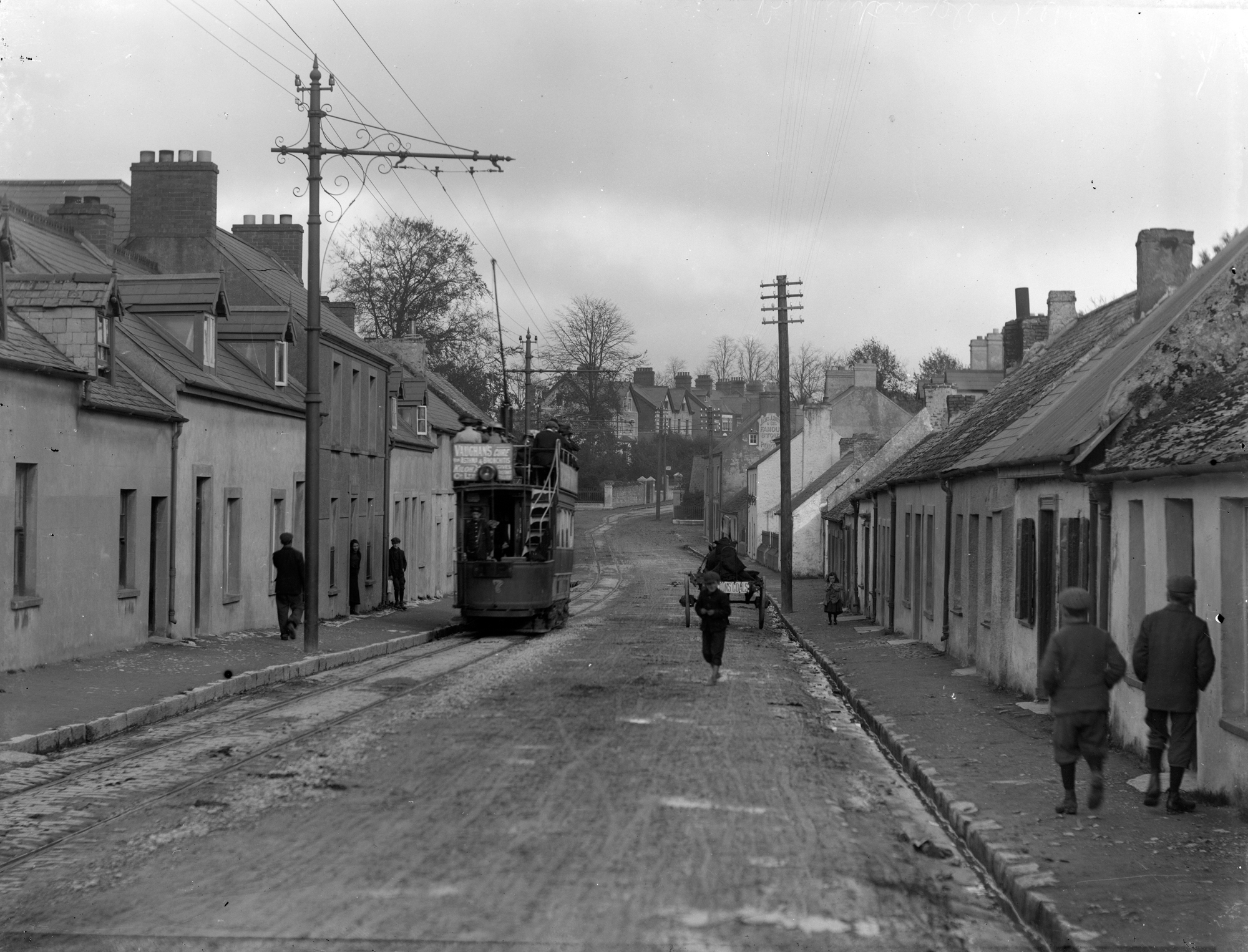
Residential Street with open top tram in Ballintemple Cork c.1910

The three cross city routes radiated out from the statue to Theobald Mathew in St Patrick's Street and were:

- Blackpool to Douglas
- Summerhill to Sunday's Well
- Tivoli to Blackrock.

The track was double through the main streets, up the Summerhill and along part of the Western Road, and short stretches of other routes. On the rest it was single with fairly frequent passing loops.

== Legacy ==
The tramway generating station at Albert Road now houses the National Sculpture Factory and the adjacent tram shed - complete with inspection and service pits (with tram rails still in place) - is also still intact and in use as a commercial premises.

=== Greenway ===
The Blackpool to Douglas route has been converted to a section of the Cork Harbour Greenway.
