= Killeagh railway station =

Railway station in Ireland

Killeagh
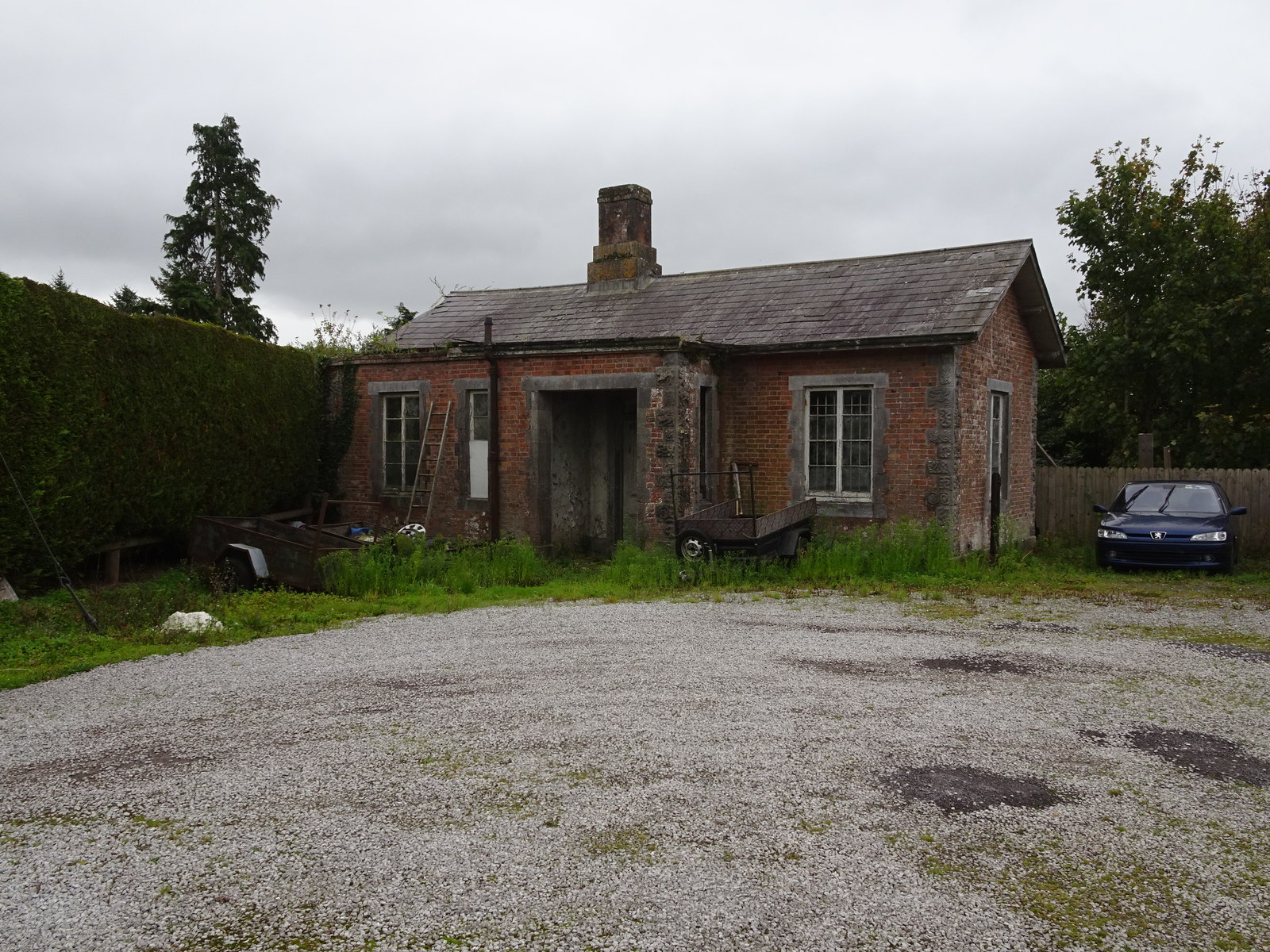
- The current site of the station building

General information
- Location: Killeagh, County Cork; Ireland

History
- Original company: Cork and Youghal Railway
- Pre-grouping: Great Southern and Western Railway
- Post-grouping: Great Southern Railways

Key dates
- 17 February 1860: Station opens
- 4 February 1963: Station closes
Location

Killeagh railway station served the town of Killeagh in County Cork, Ireland.

== History ==
The station opened on 17 February 1860. Regular passenger services were withdrawn on 4 February 1963.

The line was closed to all goods traffic except wagonload on 2 December 1974, closed to wagonload traffic except beet on 2 June 1978 and to beet traffic on 30 August 1982.

== Routes ==
Preceding station	Disused railways	Following station
Mogeely	Great Southern and Western Railway; Cork-Youghal	Youghal
