= Dunkettle railway station =

Former station near Cork, Ireland

Coordinates: 51.906°N 8.395°W

Dunkettle

General information
- Location: Ireland
- Lines: Cork and Youghal Railway

Other information
- Status: Closed

History
- Opened: 10 November 1859
- Closed: 7 February 1966
- Former names: Cork and Youghal Railway
Location

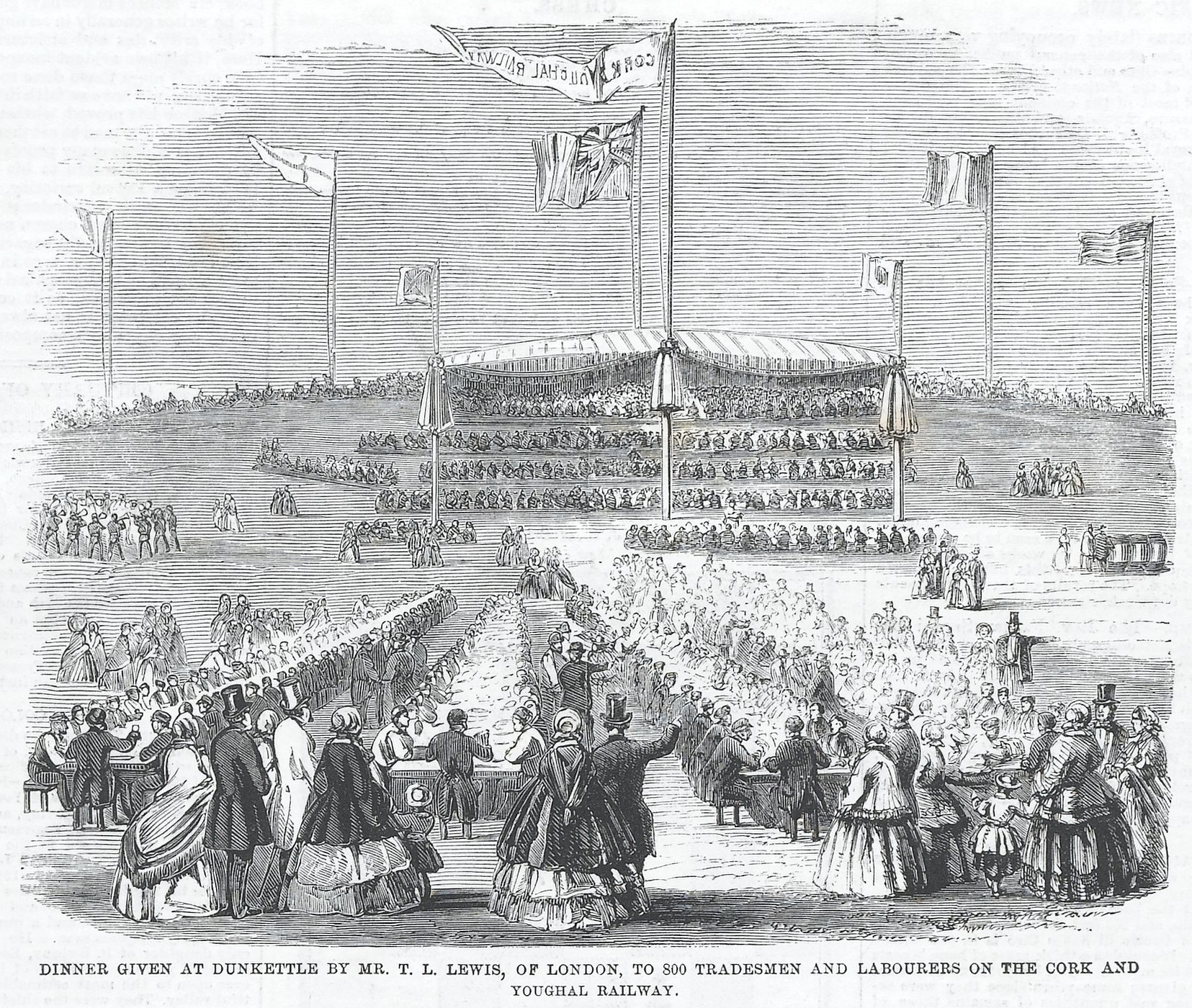
A large fete, for those who worked on the Cork and Youghal Railway, was held at Dunkettle in 1859

Dunkettle railway station was a railway station to the east of Cork city in Ireland. Originally part of the Cork and Youghal Railway, it opened on 10 November 1859 and was closed on 7 February 1966.

In May 1911, an assistant platelayer was struck by a train travelling from Cork to Queenstown (Cobh). He was transported to hospital in Cork city but died shortly afterwards.

In the early 21st century, it was proposed to reopen a station at Dunkettle on the Cobh line of the Cork Suburban Rail network. These plans were refused planning permission in 2009. By mid-2024, an updated strategic transport plan (including a possible station at Dunkettle) was reportedly projected for planning submission "by the end of [2025]". In July 2026, Irish Rail lodged a planning application for a new station, which would be a "major park and ride facility" near the Dunkettle Interchange road junction.
