= Youghal railway station =

Railway station in Ireland

Youghal Eochaill
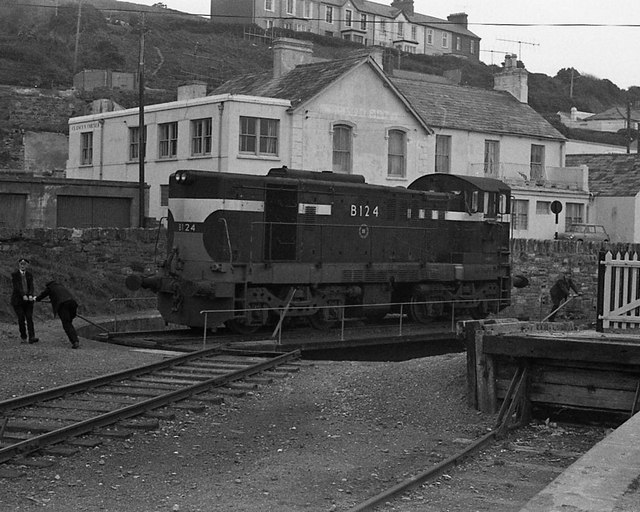
- After working a freight train from Cork, one of CIÉ's 121 class diesel locomotives is turned on the turntable at the east end of Youghal station in March 1975

General information
- Location: Front Strand; Youghal, County Cork; Ireland
- Coordinates: 51.939619°N 7.847217°W
- Elevation: 7 ft (2.1 m)

History
- Original company: Cork and Youghal Railway
- Pre-grouping: Great Southern and Western Railway
- Post-grouping: Great Southern Railways

Key dates
- 21 May 1860: Station opens
- 2 February 1963: Station closes to regular passenger traffic (remaining open for irregular excursions)
- 2 June 1978: Goods traffic ceases (except beet)
- 30 August 1982: Station closes to goods traffic
Location

Youghal railway station served the town of Youghal in County Cork, Ireland.

== History ==
The station opened on 21 May 1860. Regular passenger services were withdrawn on 2 February 1963.

The line was closed to all goods traffic except wagonload on 2 December 1974, closed to wagonload traffic except beet on 2 June 1978 and to beet traffic on 30 August 1982.

CIÉ also ran summer seaside excursions to Youghal for passengers.

The line has never been legally closed. The last train to depart from the seaside station was in 1987 by the Irish Railway Record Society. The following year Iarnród Éireann laid on two passenger trains from Midleton railway station for the Gaelic Athletic Association in Dublin.

On a visit in April 1999, some tracks and remains of the turntable were still visible.

The line was then abandoned. Since 1988 Iarnród Éireann has showed little or no interest in the line. In 1992 seven miles of track between Midleton and Youghal were removed for reuse in Sligo.

Youghal railway station has been re-roofed more recently.

== Routes ==
Preceding station	Disused railways	Following station
Killeagh	Great Southern and Western Railway; Cork-Youghal	Terminus
