= Mogeely railway station =

Railway station in Ireland

Coordinates: 51.9306°N 8.0574°W

Mogeely Magh Eile
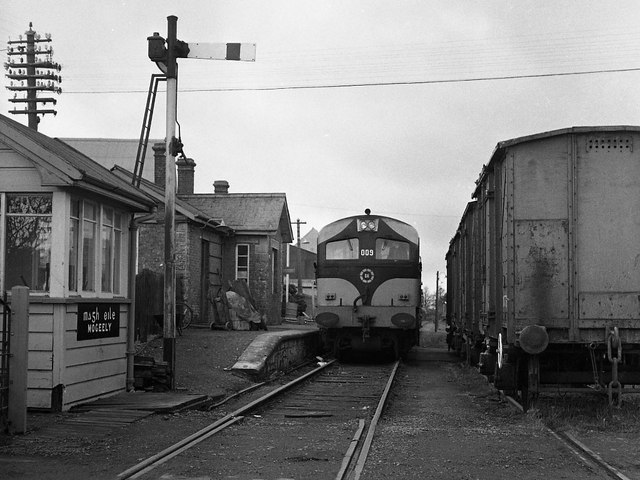
- A CIE 001 class locomotive stops at Mogeely with the daily (Mon-Fri) Cork - Youghal freight on 22 April 1977

General information
- Location: Mogeely, County Cork; Ireland

History
- Original company: Cork and Youghal Railway
- Pre-grouping: Great Southern and Western Railway
- Post-grouping: Great Southern Railways

Key dates
- 17 February 1860: Station opens
- 4 February 1963: Station closes
- Late 2019: Plans for repurposing the railway into a Greenway secured
- Early 2022: Construction of the Greenway starts
Location
- Location within County Cork Location within Ireland

Mogeely railway station served the village of Mogeely in County Cork, Ireland.

== History ==
The station opened on 17 February 1860. Regular passenger services were withdrawn on 4 February 1963.

The line was closed to all goods traffic except wagonload on 2 December 1974, closed to wagonload traffic except beet on 2 June 1978 and to beet traffic on 30 August 1982.

== Reconstruction ==
The Department of Transport announced that they will be spending €9m turning the railway station into a public Greenway. The Greenway will be a 23 km long strip of the now abandoned Midleton to Youghal railway line. It will also be the first Greenway built in County Cork. The Greenway will be a walking and cycling route through East Cork which will connect the towns and villages of Midleton, Mogeely, Killeagh and Youghal.

The Midleton to Youghal Greenway is currently under construction, and they plan to open the Midleton-Mogeely section of the Greenway in Summer 2023 (although the dates are not confirmed). They aim to open the full Midleton to Youghal Greenway sometime in early-mid 2024.

Originally, the Greenway was set to be completed in late 2022, but the construction of the Greenway was delayed by the COVID-19 pandemic.

== Routes ==
| Preceding station | Disused railways | Following station |
|---|---|---|
| Midleton | Great Southern and Western Railway; Cork-Youghal | Killeagh |
