= Barryscourt Castle =

Castle in eastern County Cork, Ireland

Coordinates: 51.904615°N 8.259374°W

- Caisleán Chúirt an Bharraigh (Irish)
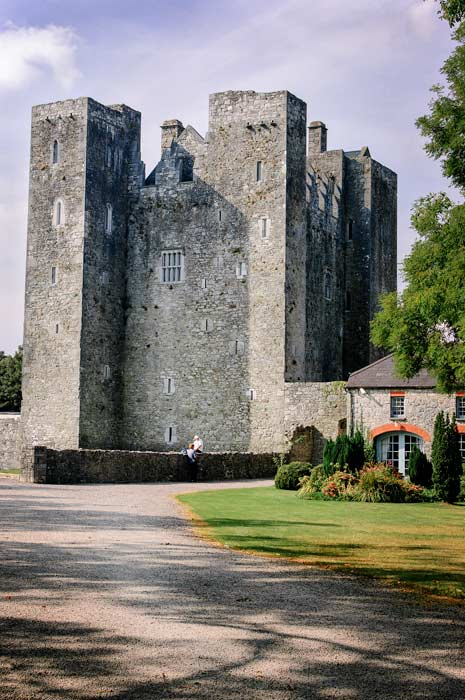
- Barryscourt Castle Entrance

- Location within Ireland
- Location: Carrigtwohill, County Cork, Ireland

History
- Built: 15th Century

Site notes
- Architectural style: Gothic
- Governing body: Office of Public Works

National monument of Ireland
- Official name: Barryscourt Castle
- Reference no.: 641

Barryscourt Castle (Caisleán Chúirt an Bharraigh in Irish) is a castle located in eastern County Cork in southern Ireland, close to the town of Carrigtwohill.

== History ==
The site on which Barryscourt Castle now stands has been occupied for over a thousand years- there is evidence of a wooden watermill having been built next to a stream at the site sometime in the 7th century, long before any fortification existed there. Barryscourt fell into the hands of the Anglo-Norman de Barry family in the 12th century, and masonry from this period found at the site may be the remains of another watermill or possibly an early fortification built by the Barrys.

While the de Barry's lands in various parts of County Cork were divided amongst various branches of the family, Barryscourt remained in the possession of the most powerful branch, the Barrymores (Barra mór or "Great Barry" in Irish). The Barrymore line later became extinct, Barryscourt thus passing to a distant cousin, James FitzRichard of the Barryroes (Barra rua, "Red Barry"), in 1556. The present Tower house at Barryscourt was probably built late in the reign of the Barrymores, either in the 15th or 16th century, with a tentative date of about 1550 based on the architectural style, and became the family seat of the Barrys.

The Barrys supported the Desmond Rebellions of 1569 and 1579, and in 1581 they destroyed or severely damaged the family castles to prevent English forces from capturing them, including Barryscourt, which was threatened by an army led by Sir Walter Raleigh. After the suppression of the second rebellion, the Barrys were pardoned by Queen Elizabeth I and Barryscourt was repaired, with an outer wall or "bawn" surrounding an inner courtyard being added, including 3 corner towers. The English-born judge Luke Gernon visited the castle in 1620 and left a detailed description of it.

Barryscourt ceased to be the main residence of the Barry family in 1617, but was evidently still an important fortification for many years afterwards, as it was attacked and captured in 1645, during the Irish Confederate War. The marks caused by the impact of cannonballs during this attack can still be seen on the castle walls.

Barryscourt castle eventually fell into disuse, and a house was built by the Coppinger family (who had taken over the property from the Barrys) next to the castle in the early 18th century; this house has long since disappeared. The Barryscourt Trust was set up in 1987 for the purpose of conserving and developing the potential of the castle as a heritage site. In the 1990s, the relatively intact shell of the tower house was repaired and reroofed by Dúchas, and is now a popular tourist heritage site run by the Office of Public Works. The interior is furnished as it would have been in the 16th century. The castle has daily guided tours available free of charge.

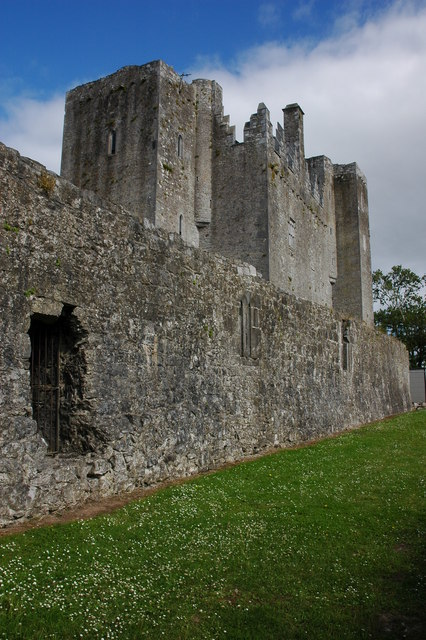
Barryscourt Castle

== Architecture ==
Barryscourt castle was built in a style fairly typical in Ireland in the 16th century, consisting of a main tower house building with smaller adjacent buildings arranged around a courtyard, which was protected by an outer "bawn" or curtain wall, with 3 smaller corner towers. A large building once stood next to the main tower inside the bawn, and was probably a dining hall, but only ruins remain. The main tower is situated at the south-west corner of the roughly rectangular curtain wall and the main entrance to the courtyard is right next to it, set into the south curtain wall (there is also a smaller gate in the north curtain wall). The dungeon is a drop-prisoner-in-from-the-top type. Three smaller turrets project from the north-east, south-east and south-west corners of the main tower. These three turrets are 5 storeys high, while the main block of the tower is only 3 storeys high.

== See also ==
- List of castles in Ireland
