= Páirc Uí Chaoimh =

Stadium in Cork, Ireland

- 'The Park' or 'De Park'

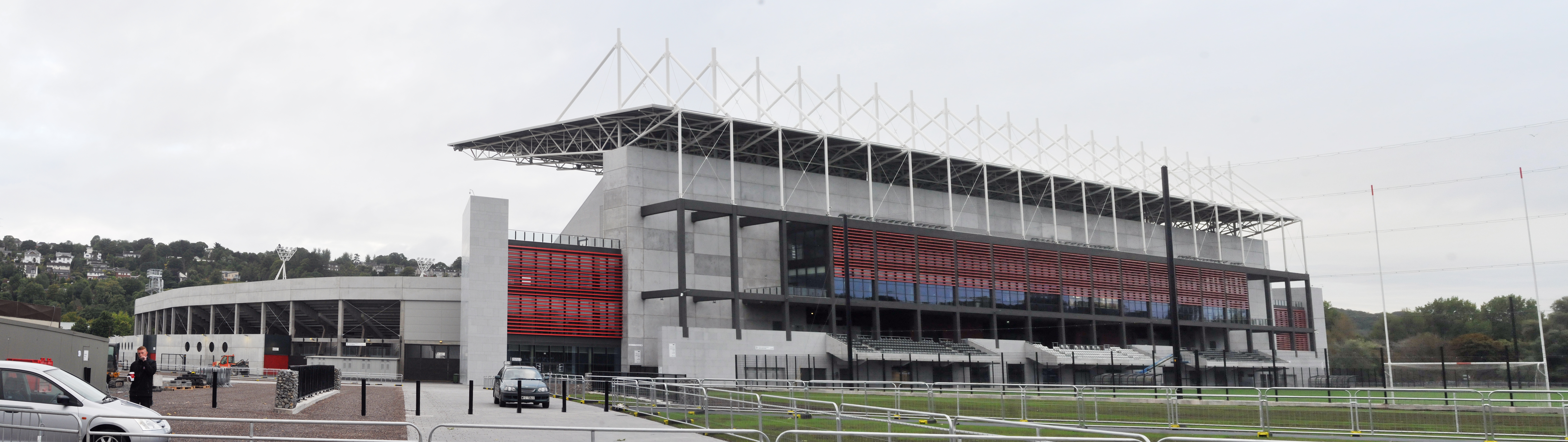
- Stadium exterior
- Interactive map of Páirc Uí Chaoimh
- Address: The Marina; Ballintemple; Cork; Ireland
- Coordinates: 51°53′59.10″N 8°26′6.15″W
- Owner: Cork County Board
- Capacity: 45,300
- Field size: 144 m x 88 m

Construction
- Groundbreaking: April 1974
- Opened: 6 June 1976
- Renovated: 2008; 2015–2017
- Cost: IR£1.7 million (original) €110 million (redevelopment)
- Architects: Horgan and Lynch (1974); Scott Tallon Walker (2015)

Tenant
- Cork GAA (1976–present)

Páirc Uí Chaoimh (Irish pronunciation: [ˈpˠaːɾʲc iː ˈxiːvʲ] PARK ee KHEEV) is a Gaelic games stadium in Cork, Ireland. Often referred to simply as "The Park", it is the home of Cork GAA and is located in Ballintemple, near the site of the original Cork Athletic Grounds. In February 2024, following a naming-rights agreement with SuperValu, the venue was branded as SuperValu Páirc Uí Chaoimh. The stadium opened in 1976 and underwent a significant two-year redevelopment before reopening in 2017.

Primarily used as a venue for Gaelic games, it has been used to host Cork's home league and championship games in both Gaelic football and hurling. The finals of both the Cork hurling and football championships have often been held at the venue. Following approval by the GAA's Central Council, soccer and rugby games have also been hosted.

The stadium has also hosted concerts by Michael Jackson, Bruce Springsteen, Prince, U2, The Stone Roses, Oasis, Elton John, Ed Sheeran and Westlife as well as the annual Siamsa Cois Laoi festival.

Originally designed by Horgan and Lynch, the stadium had an initial capacity of 50,288. This capacity was progressively reduced because of safety regulations and, before the commencement of redevelopment works in 2015, it had a capacity of 32,550. Since the completion of the redevelopment in 2017 the capacity of the venue is 45,000, making it the third-largest Gaelic games stadium in Ireland.

== History ==
=== Early ground ===
Sports meetings were frequently held on the area now occupied by Páirc Uí Chaoimh even before the establishment of the Gaelic Athletic Association. By the late 1890s the Cork County Board were allowed by the Cork Agricultural Company, the leaseholders of the land, to enclose a portion of the site for the playing of Gaelic Games. The county board built its own stadium on the land in 1898. The Cork Athletic Grounds opened in 1904 and hosted All-Ireland finals, Munster finals and National League games. These grounds were close to what is now the CAB Ford garage on the Monahan Road.

By the 1960s, the Cork Athletic Grounds did not serve the needs of the modern era, and the ground's facilities were described as "primitive" by some contemporary commentators. In 1963 the county board bought some land at Model Farm Road, on the western side of the city, as the site for a new development. It was envisaged that this new stadium would hold up to 70,000 spectators and provide more modern facilities. However, problems arose and the project was abandoned.

=== Development ===
In 1972 it was decided to redevelop the Athletic Grounds as an alternative, and additional land was acquired from the Munster Agricultural Society, whose premises adjoined the Athletic Grounds. The new stadium area covered almost 9 acres, with works undertaken by HMC Construction Ltd. Work began in April 1974, though details of the new stadium "of the most modern design and facilities" weren't unveiled until a press conference took place in the Imperial Hotel, Cork on 26 July 1974. The new stadium was estimated to cost approximately £1 million, but ultimately overran to £1.7 million.

Known as Páirc Uí Chaoimh, in commemoration of the late general-secretary of the GAA, Pádraig Ó Caoimh, the stadium was to have a capacity of 50,288. Designed by the Cork city firm of consultant engineers, Horgan and Lynch, Páirc Uí Chaoimh was designed to have seating for 19,688 spectators, half of which would be under cover on the southern side of the ground. Long-term plans envisaged the extension of the stand all around the stadium. Included underneath the stadium structure were a number of facilities, all served by the main circulation tunnel.

=== Finance ===
The Cork County Board were faced with a bill of £650,000 to cover the first stage of the development, which at the time was the biggest undertaken by any sports organisation in Ireland. In addition to grants from the GAA's Central and Munster Councils, finance for the project was raised by the sale of the Board's 45 acre property at Model Farm Road, and a sizeable part of 49 acres on the north side of the city. The Board's offices on Cook Street were also sold, while further funds were raised through Coiste Gael and commercial and private subscriptions. Additional funds were raised through the sale of 88 advertising spaces within the stadium and the sale of 3,000 five-year stand tickets at £30 each.

=== Official opening ===
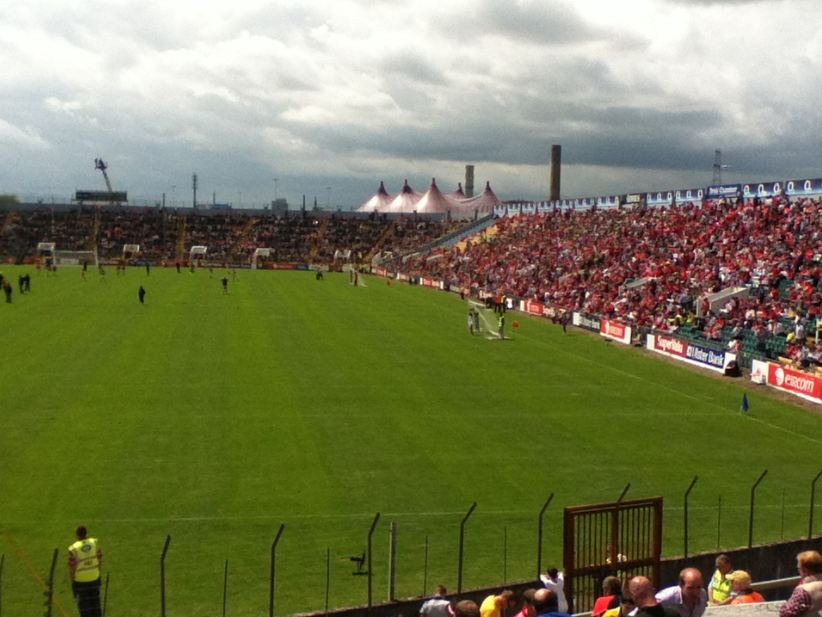
Páirc Uí Chaoimh prior to redevelopment pictured here at halftime between Cork vs Kerry 2012

Páirc Uí Chaoimh was officially opened on 6 June 1976. by Con Murphy, then president of the GAA. On the opening day the Cork hurlers played Kilkenny while the Cork footballers took on Kerry.

=== Concerts ===
The 1970s oil shocks increased interest rates and the Cork County Board was unable to repay the loan on stadium's building cost. Local promoter Oliver Barry instigated the Siamsa Cois Laoi (Irish for 'Fun by the [River] Lee'), a weekend festival of country, folk, and Irish traditional music held annually in the stadium from 1977 to 1987. Opposition from GAA traditionalists was overcome by the need for the organisation to clear mounting debts. Each Siamsa programme featured international stars supported by Irish acts. Headliners included Glen Campbell (1979 and 1983), Don McLean (1979 and 1984), Joan Baez (1980), Kate & Anna McGarrigle, Leo Sayer (1984), Loudon Wainwright III (1985), Kris Kristofferson (1985), John Denver (1986), Status Quo, and The Pogues (1987). Support included acts managed by Barry like the Wolfe Tones, Stockton's Wing, and Bagatelle, and others including the Dubliners and Christy Moore.

U2 played the final show on the European leg of the Joshua Tree Tour at the stadium in August 1987. The U2 concert established the venue's credibility with pop and rock acts. On 30 and 31 July 1988, Michael Jackson performed at the stadium twice as part of his Bad World Tour, with a combined attendance of in excess of 130,000. The County Board's share of ticket sales funded the purchase of Christy Ring Park. Páirc Uí Chaoimh was also the venue for Prince's first ever Irish concert on 7 July 1990, as part of his Nude Tour. U2 played again at the stadium on 24 August 1993 on their ZooTv Tour. 1995 saw the Féile Festival being transferred to Cork for one year, with the line-up including Ash, The Stone Roses, Paul Weller and Kylie Minogue. Oasis then performed two nights at the stadium in August 1996. Bruce Springsteen played at the stadium in July 2013 and again in May 2024.

The first concerts of the redeveloped stadium were the opening concerts of Ed Sheeran's ÷ Tour over three nights in May 2018. Sheeran also returned for two nights in April 2023 as part of his +–=÷× Tour. Elton John hosted part of his Farewell Yellow Brick Tour at the venue on 1 July 2022.

=== Improvements ===
In 2005, the Cork County Board replaced all wood bench seats with plastic bucket seats in the covered and open stands. Due to the shape of the new bucket seats, overall legroom was reduced, with many complaining of being unable to sit in the seat entirely. In response, the tops were cut off the back of each seat, marginally improving legroom.

In October 2007, plans were announced which proposed to redevelop Páirc Uí Chaoimh into a 60,000-seat sports and concert venue in conjunction with the Cork Docklands redevelopment which was estimated to cost over €30m. If these plans had gone ahead, Cork would have had the second largest stadium in the country behind Croke Park. This specific plan was not progressed.

=== Association football ===
On 25 September 2018, the stadium hosted association football for the first time, a benefit match for Cork-born Ireland international Liam Miller, who died of cancer aged 36 that February. A Manchester United legends team defeated a Republic of Ireland/Celtic legends team 3–2 on penalties after the match had finished 2–2 after 90 minutes. The official attendance for the match was 42,878. Juvenile Gaelic football and hurling exhibition games took place at half time, involving the team that Miller himself represented as a boy, Éire Óg.

The first international football match to take place at Páirc Uí Chaoimh was a UEFA Women's Euro 2025 qualifier between the Republic of Ireland and France. The Republic of Ireland won 3-1, with Cork native Denise O'Sullivan becoming the first player to score an international goal at the stadium. On 18 September 2024, after the UK Government announced it would not provide the additional funding required for the redevelopment of Casement Park for UEFA Euro 2028 the Irish Government pushed for Páirc Uí Chaoimh to be an alternative option to host games originally scheduled to be held in Belfast, the proposal was supported by the GAA.

=== Rugby union ===
Páirc Uí Chaoimh hosted its first rugby match on 10 November 2022, breaking the record for the most spectators at a rugby match in Munster with 41,400 in attendance. In the game, Munster beat a touring South Africa A side 28 to 14.

The stadium also hosted a game between New Zealand rugby union side Crusaders and Munster on 3 February 2024. Munster defeated Crusaders, by 21 to 19, in front of a "capacity" crowd of 40,885.

=== Sponsorship ===
In early 2024, it was reported that the Cork County Board and Musgrave Group had agreed a three-year naming rights deal, to refer to the stadium as "SuperValu Páirc". With criticism from some commentators (including as the proposed name dropped the "name of the man [..] after whom Páirc Uí Chaoimh was named"), as of 17 January the board stated that "no final decision has been taken" on the proposed name. As a compromise, "SuperValu Páirc Uí Chaoimh" was subsequently proposed as a sponsorship name, and ratified by county committee delegates on 1 February 2024.

== Redevelopment ==
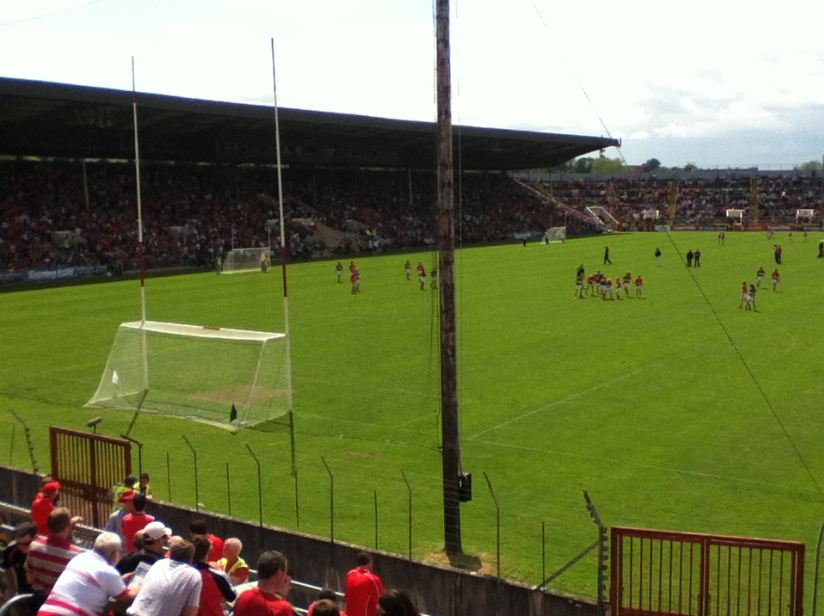
Munster football semi-final 2012 (prior to redevelopment)

=== Plans ===
In June 2010, Cork City Council voted in favour of the proposal to make 6.82 acres (27,600 m^{2}) of land next to Páirc Uí Chaoimh available for the redevelopment of the stadium. As part of the redevelopment, a new 'Centre of Excellence' was also planned, with an ancillary all-weather pitch, floodlights, 1,000 seat stand, gym and changing and medical facilities. A museum was also proposed, with dining facilities and a 400-space car park.

The stadium plans expected a small increase in capacity, with the new development accommodating 45,000 when completed. The development had been subject to local opposition as some residents complained that land used for the redevelopment had been earmarked for a public park. With Cork's average attendance not breaking 20,000 in 2011, there were also questions about the need for such a big venue, including by the Munster Council Secretary Pat Fitzgerald.

The redevelopment plans proposed stand capacities as follows:

- New 3-tier South Stand (covered) 13,000 seats (up from its previous level of 9,435)
- Refurbished North stand (covered) 8,000 seats (down from its previous level of 10,030)
- Refurbished East and West Terrace 12,000 capacity each (uncovered)

In summer 2013, it was announced that an application was being lodged to redevelop the stadium, but due to financial difficulties the project was put on hold.

=== Demolition and construction works ===
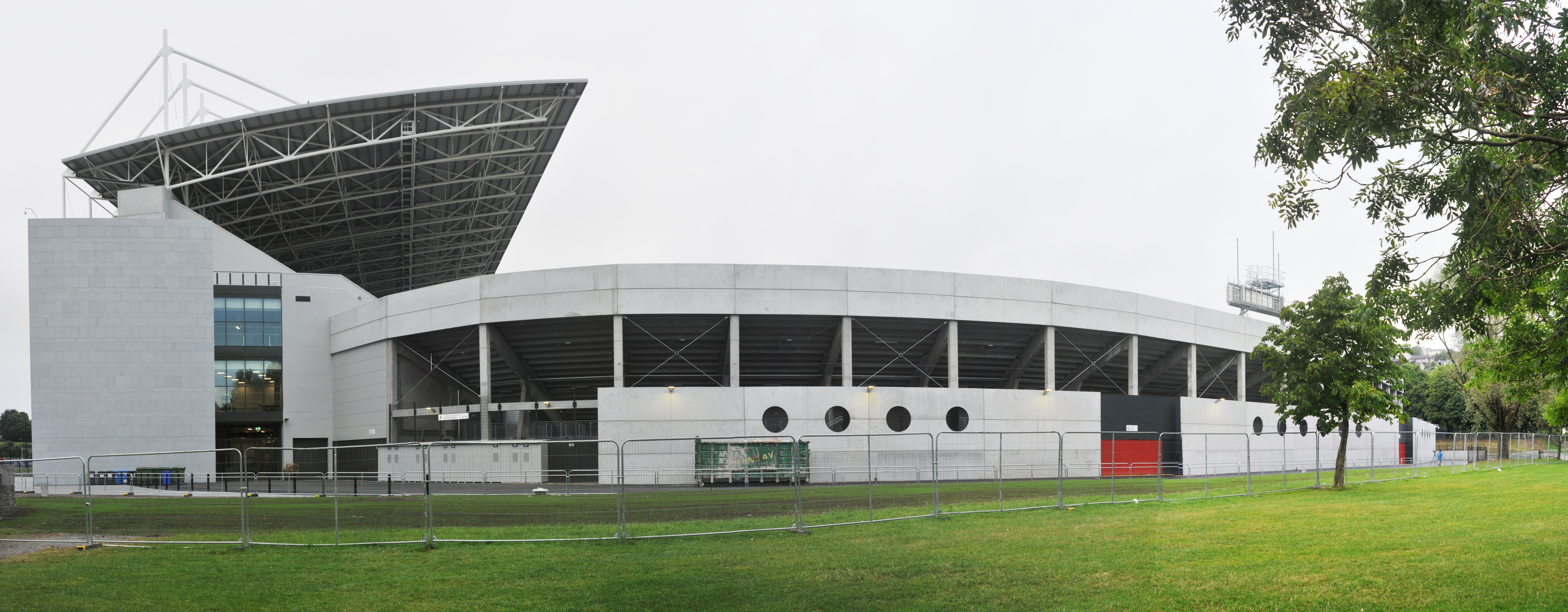
East side of redeveloped Páirc Uí Chaoimh

In April 2014, Cork County Board and Cork City Council announced that they had been given the green light to proceed with the redevelopment project of the stadium.

In May 2014, the Government sanctioned a €30 million grant to help fund the regeneration of the stadium. The work was due to start in summer 2014, and on 6 July 2014, the stadium hosted its last provincial football final in the old stadium with rivals Kerry running out comfortable winners 0–24 to Cork 0–12. It also hosted the 2014 Munster Senior Hurling Championship Final on 13 July 2014, with Cork beating rivals Limerick, 2–24 to 0–24, the final inter county game before demolition took place. In November 2014 An Bord Pleanala gave the green light to redevelop the stadium with redevelopment works running from January 2015 to mid-2017.

=== Reopening ===
It had been planned to hold the 2017 Munster Senior Hurling and Football finals at the reopened stadium, but construction delays forced these to be relocated. The first match at the re-developed stadium was instead a Cork premier intermediate hurling championship game between Valley Rovers and Blarney on 19 July 2017, which attracted a crowd of 10,749.

The venue then hosted two 2017 All-Ireland hurling quarter-finals on consecutive days later in July 2017, with combined attendances of more than 64,000. The first of these games, on 22 July 2017, was the first championship match at the re-developed stadium, and saw Tipperary defeat Clare by 0–28 to 3–16. Clare's Tony Kelly scored the first point and Aaron Cunningham the first goal at the new stadium.

As of December 2017, the cost of the redevelopment was reportedly €86.4 million (approximately €23m over the planned budget), which included the cost of development of two covered stands, and two uncovered terrace ends. The updated stadium also has four 35-space dressing rooms with under-floor heating, physio, warm-up, drug-testing, referee, and first aid rooms.

By December 2018, stadium commercial director Peter McKenna declared that the final cost of rebuilding Páirc Uí Chaoimh could be as high as €110m, which is €24m higher than the €86m quoted when works were completed in 2017.

In March 2020, the Cork County Board of the GAA confirmed they had made the stadium available to the Health Service Executive for use during the COVID-19 pandemic.

The stadium is a trailhead for the Cork Harbour Greenway.

== Capacity and records ==
Prior to the 2017 redevelopment, the capacity included 9,500 seats in the covered (Sean McCarthy) stand, 10,000 in the uncovered stand, approximately 12,000 in the "Blackrock end" terrace, approximately 12,000 in the "City end" terracing, and 50 in the wheelchair area.

Following the 2017 redevelopment, the main (covered) south stand seats 13,000, the north (covered) stand seats 8,000 and the city and "Blackrock end" terraces each have a capacity of 12,000. The south stand, which has three levels, includes a 2,238-seat premium level.

The record attendance at Páirc Uí Chaoimh was 49,961 for the 1985 Munster Final between Cork and Tipperary. Prior to this, in 1983, Páirc Uí Chaoimh hosted an All-Ireland Senior Football Championship semi-final replay in which Cork lost to Dublin. This was only the second time an All-Ireland semi-final had been held outside Croke Park since 1941. The stadium hosted its first rugby match in November 2022, breaking the record for the most spectators at a rugby match in Munster.

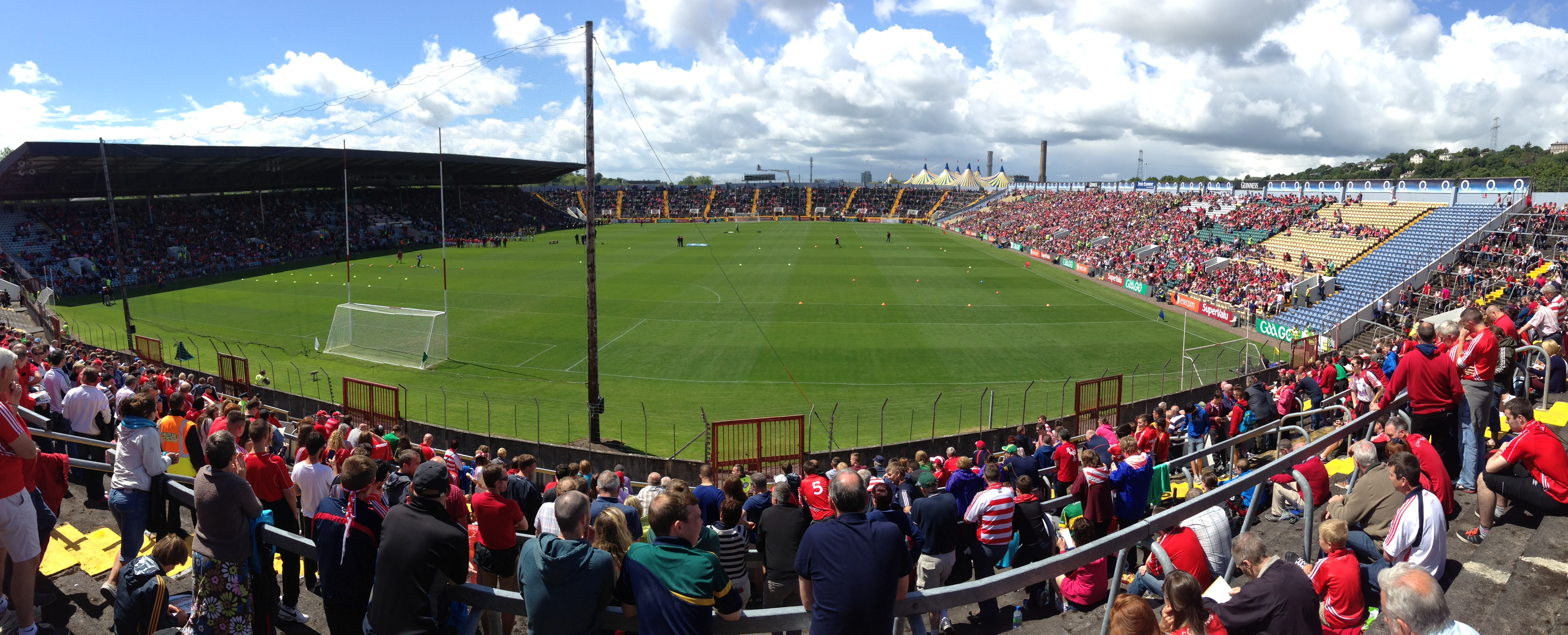
Páirc Uí Chaoimh 2014 Cork vs Kerry (prior to 2015 closure and redevelopment)

== See also ==
- List of Gaelic Athletic Association stadiums
- List of stadiums in Ireland by capacity
