= Fota Wildlife Park =

Wildlife park on Fota Island, Ireland

- Interactive map of Fota Wildlife Park
- 51.891°N 8.307°W
- Date opened: June 1983; 43 years ago
- Location: Fota Island, County Cork, Ireland
- Land area: 100 acres (40 ha)
- No. of species: 106
- Annual visitors: 455,559 (2017)
- Website: fotawildlife.ie

Fota Wildlife Park is a 100-acre (40 ha) wildlife park located on Fota Island, near Carrigtwohill, County Cork, Ireland. Opened in 1983, it is an independently funded, not-for-profit charity that is one of the leading tourism, wildlife and conservation attractions in Ireland. The park had an attendance of 455,559 visitors in 2017, making it the eleventh most popular paid attraction in Ireland for that year.

The park is home to nearly 30 mammal and 50 bird species. Some of the animals roam freely with the visitors, such as the ring-tailed lemurs and wallabies, while larger animals, including the giraffe and bison, live in paddocks with barriers that are intended to be unobtrusive for visitors to view the animals in a more natural environment. Fota Wildlife Park also has red pandas, tapirs, siamang gibbons and other types of animals.

== History and development ==
=== Foundation ===
Fota Island was the former home of the Smith-Barry family, descendants of Normans who came to Ireland in the 12th century. While the family's lands were originally more extensive, they dwindled over time until they were restricted to Fota Island. The estate was sold to University College Cork in 1975.

In the meantime, Dublin Zoo had reached maximum development with the space available. So in 1979, the director of Dublin Zoo proposed to the Zoological Society of Ireland Council that a wildlife park should be established, and the site at Fota Island was proposed. The same year it was formally agreed that the society would establish a wildlife park at Fota. University College Cork offered the land free of charge under a licence agreement. Fota Wildlife Park became a joint project of the Zoological Society of Ireland and University College Cork. Fundraising committees were set up in both Dublin and Cork. All the funds for the development were raised from public subscriptions, apart from a grant from Bord Fáilte for the perimeter fence.

The first animals started to arrive to Fota Wildlife Park in late 1982, and Fota Wildlife Park was opened in the summer of 1983 by the then President of Ireland, Dr. Patrick Hillery.

=== Further development ===
==== Cheetah run ====
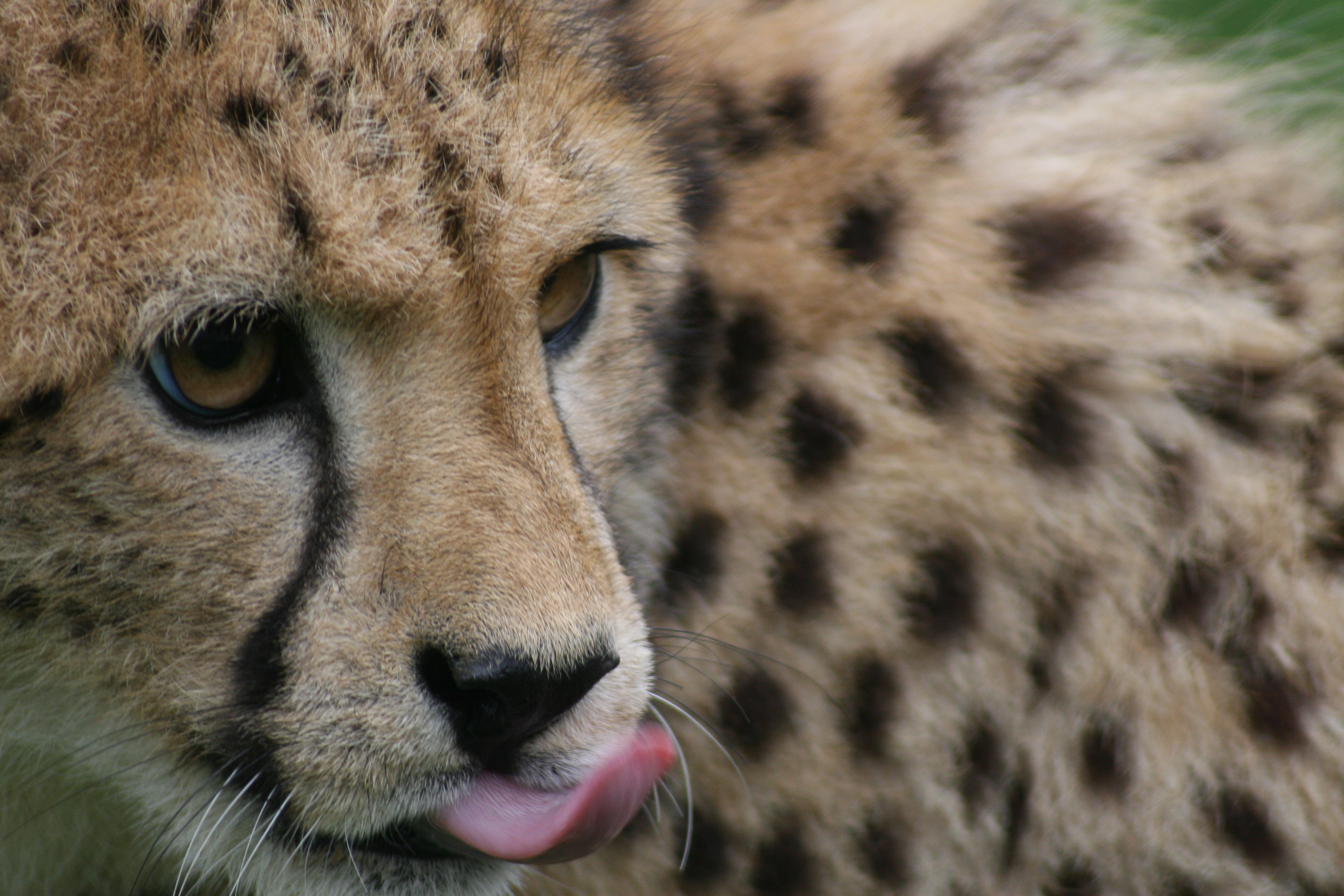
Cheetah at Fota Wildlife Park

Cheetahs, by their nature, will not work for food if they do not have to, and to exercise the animals and for behavioural enrichment reasons, the park installed a "Cheetah Run" in 2006. This device suspends food items on a wire that travels 10 feet (3.0 m) off the ground, at approximately 65 kilometres per hour (40 mph).

==== Education centre ====
As part of the park's conservation and education mandate, an education centre was opened, and runs courses on a range of topics including ecology and conservation. These are aimed at students at primary school and secondary school level, and the centre also runs summer camps during school holidays. Every year, an average of 15,000 students participate in Fota's education programmes.

==== Big cats and tropical house ====
Fota Wildlife Park celebrated its 30th anniversary on 22 June 2013, and following this anniversary, announced the addition of a "Tropical House" and 27 acre "Asian Sanctuary". As of 2017, habitats for Sumatran tigers, Indian rhinos, lion-tailed macaques and Asian lions have been opened in the "Asian Sanctuary".

=== Awards ===
Fota Wildlife Park has been awarded 'Best Family Day Out' for both Munster and Cork on several occasions. In November 2016, it was awarded 'Experience Destination of the Year' by Customer Experience Insights (CXi). It is also in the Top 25 Zoos/Animal Parks in Europe in the 2015 Tripadvisor Travellers Choice Awards.

=== Television show ===
As of early 2020, Fota Wildlife Park was featured in a documentary on Virgin Media Television. The series, called Fota: Into the Wild, was filmed at the park over two years as well as covering some of the broader conservation work the park's employees are involved in (with some filming involving projects in Madagascar and Romania).

== Animals and their habitats ==
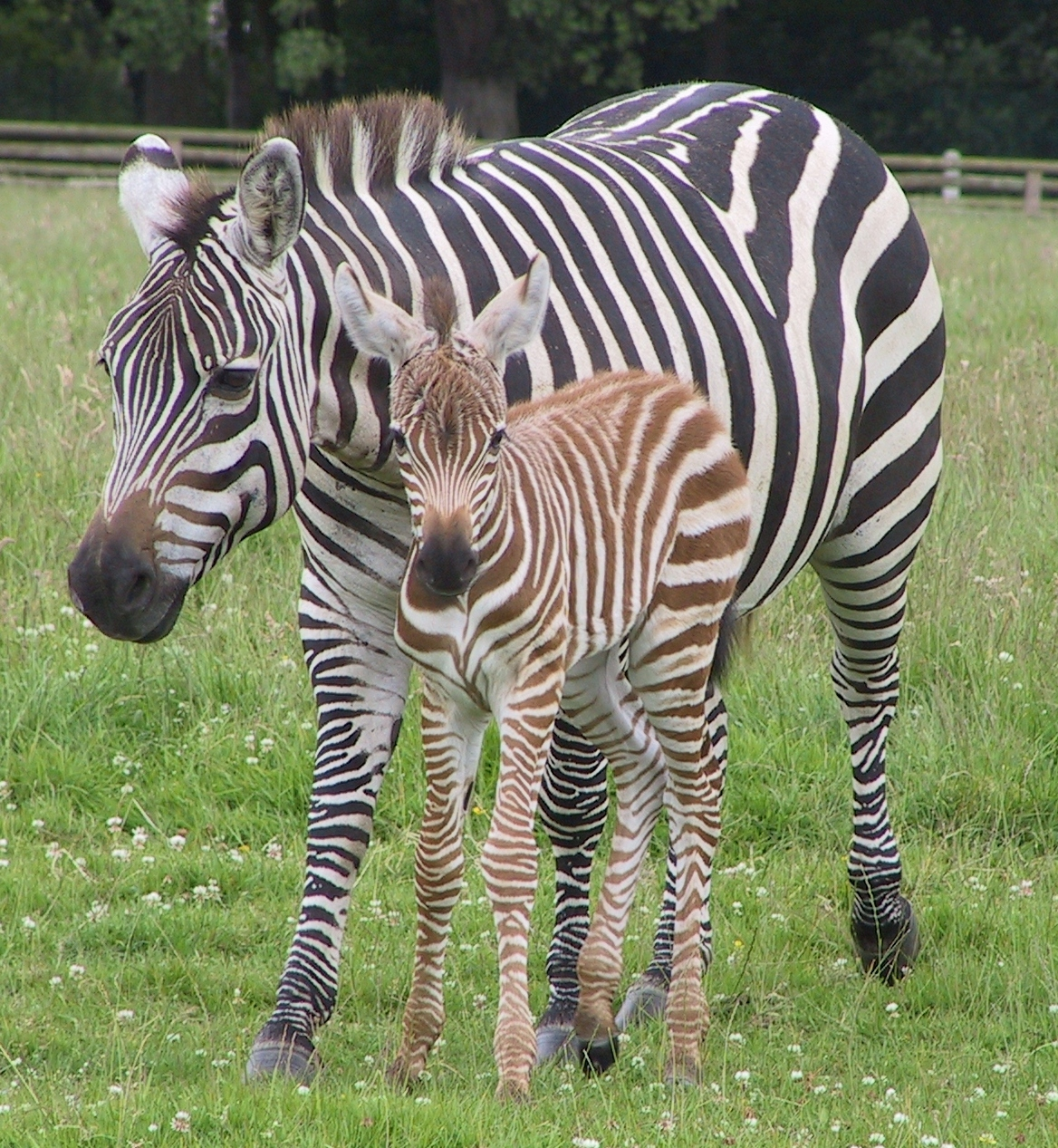
Zebra and foal at Fota Wildlife Park

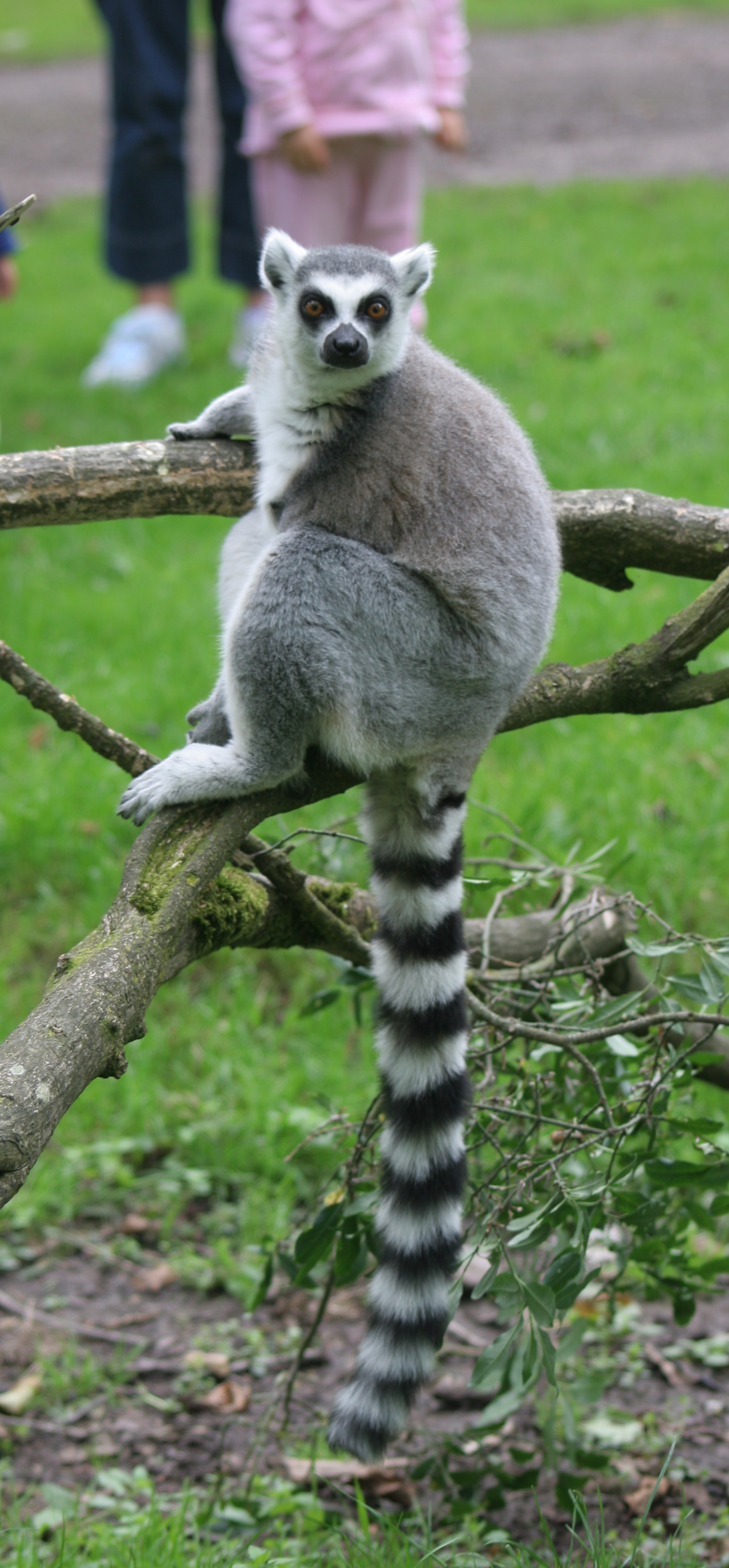
Free ranging ring tailed lemur

The animals and birds at Fota Wildlife Park originate from a variety of habitats, a number of which are threatened with degradation through human activity. Fota runs the European Endangered Species Programme (EEP) for the Sudan cheetah and the European Studbook (ESB) for Lechwe (Kafue lechwe and Red lechwe).

A number of sections of the park are arranged by habitat and region. These areas include the 'Asian Sanctuary' section, which houses the park's Sumatran tiger, Visayan spotted deer, Visayan warty pig, lion-tailed macaque, Indian rhino, and Asiatic lion. The 'African Savannah' paddock is home to ostrich, Grant's zebra, scimitar-horned oryx and Rothschild's giraffe breeds. When opened in 2014, the 'Tropical House' housed three reptile, nine amphibian, 28 fish and 14 butterfly species among 340 tropical plants. A number of aquatic bird species (including penguins, Chilean flamingos, and great white pelicans) are found in wetlands around the park's 'Monkey Island' section, which itself houses black howler, Colombian spider monkeys, and Siamang gibbon and lemur species. Some mammals, like kangaroo, wallaby and mara species, roam somewhat freely within sections of the park.

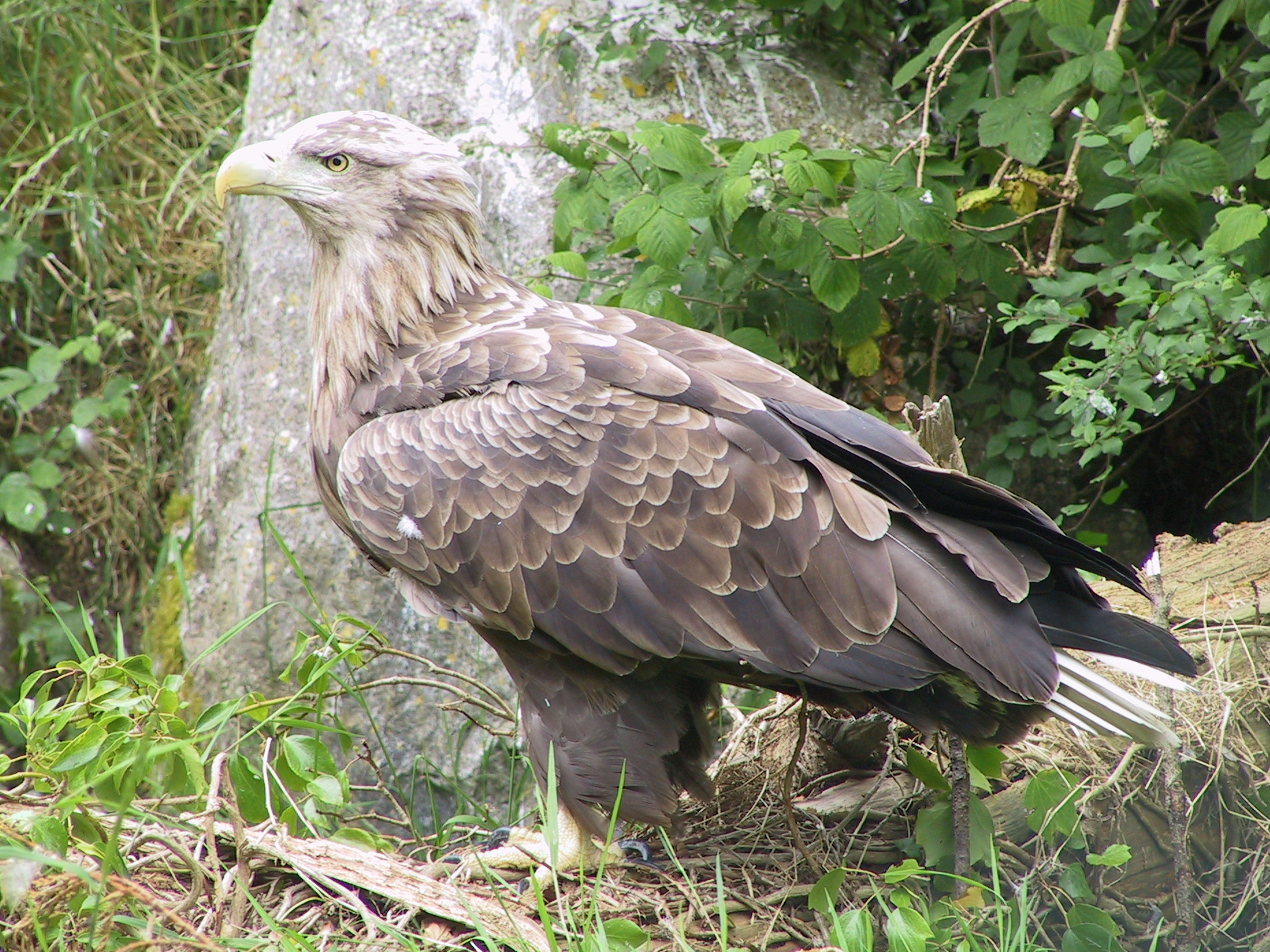
Female white tailed sea eagle at Fota Wildlife Park

== See also ==
- List of tourist attractions in Ireland
