= Zoological Society of Ireland =

Zoo operator, successor to former learned society

- Formation: 1993
- Location: Dublin, Ireland

The Zoological Society of Ireland (ZSI) is the body responsible for running Dublin Zoo, where it is based, and Fota Wildlife Park in County Cork. It is the successor to the Royal Zoological Society of Ireland (RZSI), a learned society for the study of zoology.

== History ==
The original ZSI was founded in Dublin on 10 May 1830 at a meeting in the Rotunda Hospital called and chaired by His Grace The 3rd Duke of Leinster, "to form a collection of living animals on the plan to the Zoological Society of London". Dublin Zoo opened in September 1831 in the Phoenix Park. The Society's first general meeting was held in November 1832. In 1838, the Zoo held an open day to mark the coronation of Queen Victoria and the Society was rewarded with the prefix "Royal" in its name.

In October 1993, the members of the RZSI voted to dissolve the society and transfer its assets to a new non-profit limited company called "Zoological Society of Ireland Limited". This was to facilitate government and private funding arrangements for future development. Responsibility for government assistance was transferred at the same time from the Department of Education to the Office of Public Works (the OPW).
