= Cork Suburban Rail =

Railway network in Ireland

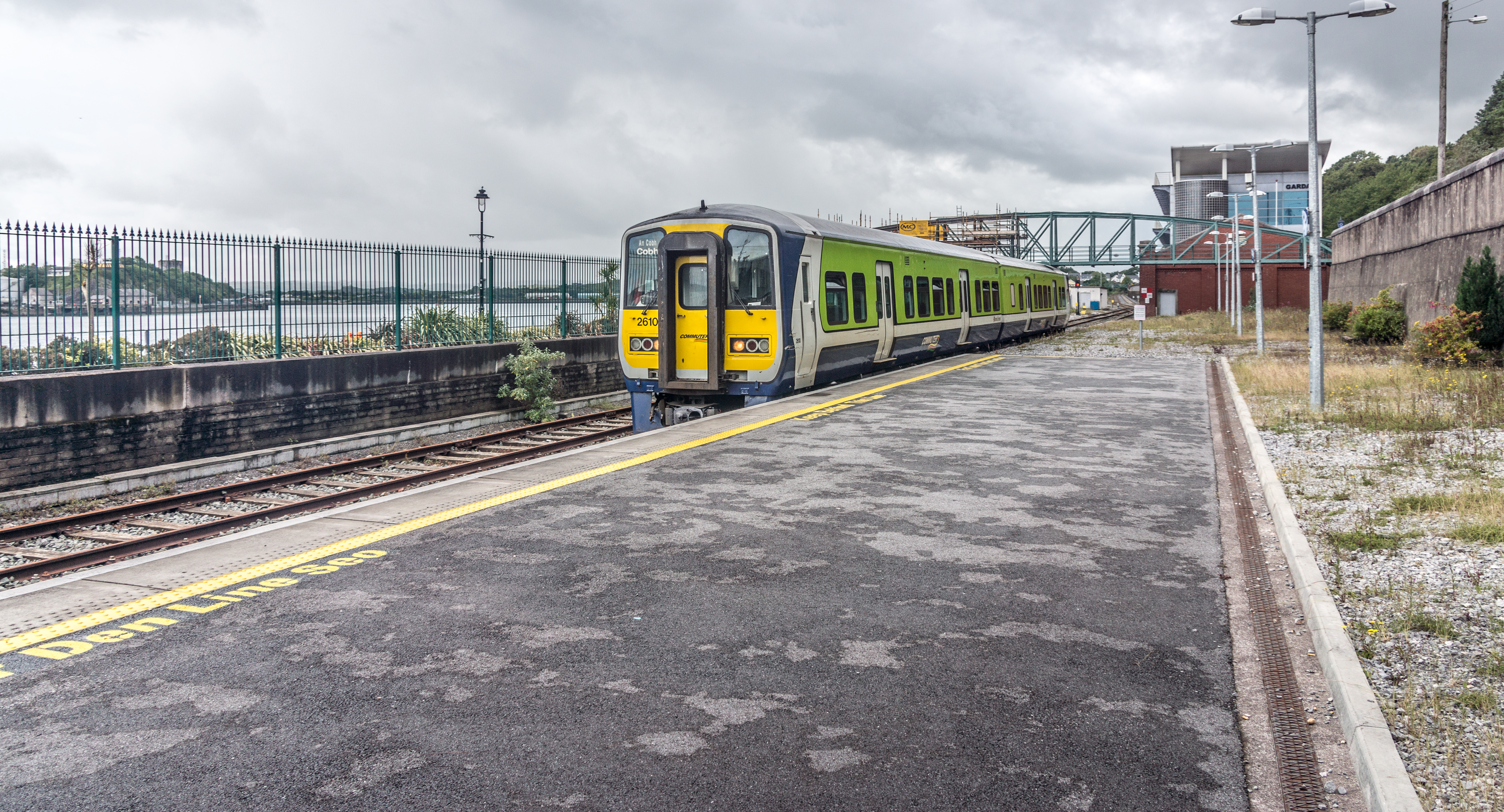
A train departing from Cobh.

The Cork Suburban Rail (Irish: Iarnród Fobhailteach Chorcaí) network serves areas in and around Cork city in Ireland.

There has been a suburban rail system in Cork since the middle of the 19th century; however, it was subject to line closures in the 20th century. The city also had a tram network - a short-lived horse-tram service in the 1870s and an electric tram system between 1898 and 1931.

The Cork Suburban Rail network operates on three lines, and is served by 10 stations.

In 2018, there were 3.46 million passenger journeys on the Cork to Dublin line (up 10% from 2017), 908,000 on the Cork to Cobh line, and 437,000 on the Cork to Midleton line (up 5.8%).

== Routes ==
=== Cork Kent to Mallow ===
Three services run from Cork Kent to Mallow.

Dedicated commuter services using 2600 class railcars supplement stops at Mallow and Cork Kent by 22000 class railcar operated services from Cork Kent to Tralee Casement and Mark 4 locomotive hauled coach and 22000 class railcar services from Cork Kent to Dublin Heuston.

Mallow is served by seven commuter trains, three intercity trains from Cork Kent to Tralee Casement, and 14 intercity trains from Cork Kent to Dublin Heuston per day. A single weekday service, the 06:15 Cork Kent to Dublin Heuston express, does not stop at Mallow.

=== Cork Kent to Cobh ===
Services run from Cork Kent to Little Island, Glounthaune, Fota, Carrigaloe, Rushbrooke, Cobh. The Cork Kent to Cobh journey takes 24 minutes, stopping at all stations. Following an upgrade in July 2022, trains run every 30 minutes.

The service is normally provided by two-coach 2600 Class diesel railcar sets, although trains of two sets are often used when to service the arrival of international cruise liners in Cobh. Fota station is especially busy during summer months, as the station serves visitors to Fota Wildlife Park.

=== Cork Kent to Midleton ===
Services run from Cork Kent to Little Island, Glounthaune, Carrigtwohill and Midleton. The journey time between Cork Kent and Midleton is 23 minutes. Following an upgrade in July 2022, trains run every 30 minutes. In combination with services to Cobh, trains call at Little Island and Glounthaune every 15 minutes.

This project was funded under the Irish Government's Transport 21 investment programme and opened on 31 July 2009. It involved the provision of a 10 km (6.25 miles) single track railway to Midleton with a passing loop at Carrigtwohill, new bridges to replace level crossings, improving existing bridges, new signalling systems and the reopening of Carrigtwohill and Midleton stations.

The former Cork to Youghal rail line east of Glounthaune was closed to scheduled rail traffic in the mid 1970s. The line to Youghal railway station had irregular freight and "special" passenger train traffic up until 1988 when it was fully closed and became derelict. After calls and political pressure for its re-opening, it was proposed under Transport 21 to renew the line as far as Midleton. After numerous delays, construction finally began in early 2008, and it opened in July 2009. The section from Midleton to Youghal is to become a public greenway.

== Proposals ==
The "Cork Metropolitan Area Transport Strategy 2040", published in 2019, proposed the electrification of the suburban rail and the addition of new stations on the Cork to Cobh line at Tivoli, Dunkettle, Ballynoe, Carrigtwohill West and Water Rock, and at Blarney, Monard, and Blackpool on the Mallow line. A proposal to reopen the Tivoli station (prompted by the relocation of the Port of Cork from Tivoli to Ringaskiddy) was also included in a planned 2019 urban regeneration scheme.

As of 2022, Irish Rail was implementing the CMATS 2040 recommendations under its "Cork Area Commuter Rail Programme". By 2023, construction had begun on a new through platform at Kent Station, to enable trains from Mallow to carry on to stations on the tracks towards Midleton and Cobh. Permission was granted by An Bord Pleanala in November 2023 to double track the line between Midleton and Glounthaune. Funding for the plan was partially provided as part of the EU's Recovery and Resilience Facility, developed in the wake of the COVID-19 pandemic.

In mid-2024, planning consultants had reportedly been appointed to complete the design and other planning submissions (for the proposed new stations) ahead of a railway order application "by the end of [2025]".

== See also ==
- Cork City Railways
- Belfast Suburban Rail
- Dublin Suburban Rail
- Limerick Suburban Rail
- Galway Suburban Rail
- Rail transport in Ireland
