= Cork and Youghal Railway =

Early Irish railway line now partially closed

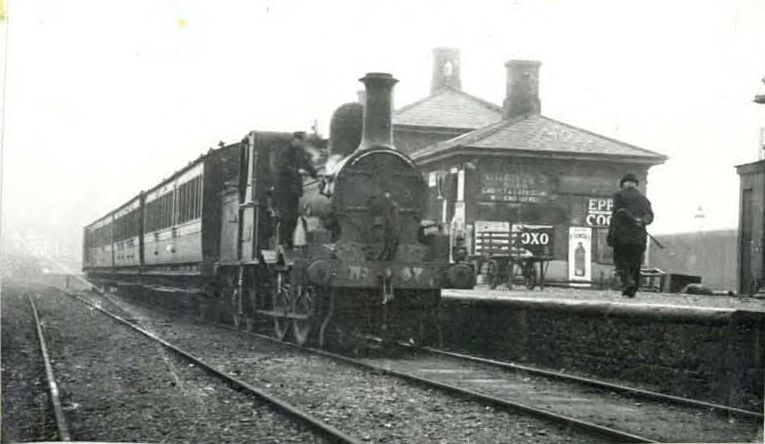
- GS&WR train at Youghal 1902

Overview
- Other name(s): Cork, Youghal and Queenstown Direct

Service
- Type: heavy rail
- Services: Cork—Youghal; Cork—Cobh(Queenstown)

History
- Opened: 10 November 1859 (Note: Dunkettle to Midleton)
- Completed: 10 March 1862

Technical
- Line length: 34 mi (55 km)
- Track gauge: 5 ft 3 in (1,600 mm)

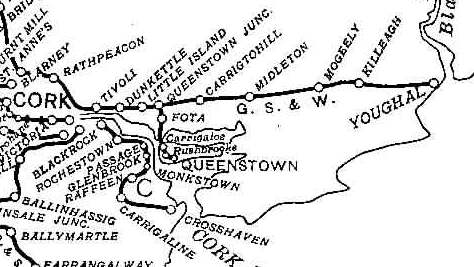
Cork and Youghal Railway (from Viceregal Commission 1906 map)

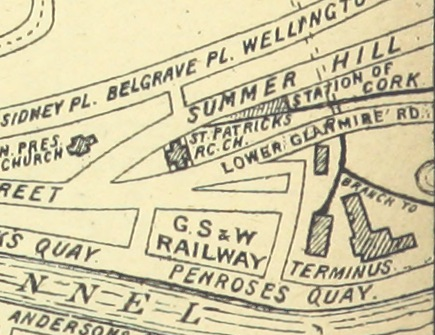
GS&WR Penrose Quay and C&YR Summerhill stations

The Cork and Youghal Railway (C&YR) was a company that built and operated a short 27 miles (43 km) railway built in the early 1860s in Ireland linking Cork with Youghal, a small resort with harbour at the mouth of the Munster Blackwater. There was an additional 6-mile (9.7 km) branch to Cobh (Queenstown), a deepwater port in Cork Harbour associated with transatlantic liners. The railway was forced into administration within a few short years due to the bankruptcy of major shareholder David Leopold Lewis and was taken over by the much larger Great Southern and Western Railway (GS&WR). The branch to Cobh became the main line and by the late 1980s was the only part of the previously extensive rail network around Cork City to remain operational apart from the main line to Dublin. 2009 saw the Midleton branch re-open to Cork while the remainder of the route is being converted to a greenway in the 2020s.

== History ==
=== C&YR ===
Cork and Waterford Railway Act 1846
- Act of Parliament
- Parliament of the United Kingdom
- Long title: An Act for making a Railway from Cork to Waterford, with Branches therefrom.
- Citation: 9 & 10 Vict. c. cccxcvii

Dates
- Royal assent: 26 August 1846

Text of statute as originally enacted

Cork and Waterford Railway Amendment Act 1851
- Act of Parliament
- Parliament of the United Kingdom
- Long title: An Act to enable the Cork and Waterford Railway Company to make Arrangements as to their Capital, and to provide for the immediate Completion of the Tramore Branch.
- Citation: 14 & 15 Vict. c. xcv

Dates
- Royal assent: 24 July 1851

Text of statute as originally enacted

A company called the Cork and Waterford Railway was established by the Cork and Waterford Railway Act 1846 (9 & 10 Vict. c. cccxcvii) which explored a route between the two major south coast cities via Youghal and Dungarvan. Had this come to fruition it has been commented the traffic levels on the line would likely have been significantly larger.

Cork and Youghal Railway Act 1854
- Act of Parliament
- Parliament of the United Kingdom
- Long title: An Act to extend the Powers of the Cork and Waterford Railway Company, and to enable them to abandon Part of their Railway to Waterford, and the Branch to Tramore; and for other Purposes.
- Citation: 17 & 18 Vict. c. ccvi

Dates
- Royal assent: 31 July 1854

Text of statute as originally enacted

The right to build a line from Cork to Youghal was established by the Cork and Youghal Railway Act 1854 (17 & 18 Vict. c. ccvi), which also renamed the Cork and Waterford Railway Company to the Cork and Youghal Railway Company. The C&YR was initially under the chairmanship of Isaac Butt, member of Parliament for Youghal, and leader of the Irish Party in the House of Commons. Little progress seems to have been made until the arrival of a financier from London, David Leopold Lewis. (Note: David Leopold Lewis is not to be confused with the dramatist Leopold David Lewis, though both have London and Youghal connections and may be related) Lewis had grand plans to turn Youghal into a "Brighton-by-the-sea" resort and approached the project with gusto, not only buying C&YR shares at a 40% premium, acquiring a pleasure steamer for trips up the Munster Blackwater, and culminating in the purchasing of most of the town of Youghal from William Cavendish, 7th Duke of Devonshire in 1861.

Butt was replaced in 1859 by Cusack Patrick Roney who had board level experience with the Cambridge and Lincoln Railway Company and Eastern Counties Railway in England; and the Grand Trunk Railway Company of Canada. Murray and McNeil credit Roney with keeping the C&YR enterprise going despite the activities of Lewis; though Roney does seem to extol the railway; Youghal with its rejunvination by Lewis; and the Lewis pleasure steamship trip up the Blackwater in his book How to Spend a Month in Ireland. (Note: This is sourced from the 1968 edition of the book, it would seem probable this was also in the 1861 second edition also)

10 November 1859 saw the Dunkettle to Midleton section of the line opened for traffic by George Howard, 7th Earl of Carlisle, Lord Lieutenant of Ireland who also cut the first sod of the Cobh branch and knighted John Arnott, the incumbent Lord Mayor of Cork and a C&YR director, all on the same day. Passengers were conveyed the two miles from King Street in Cork to Dunkettle by horse omnibus, an extra 40 minutes being allowed. Services extended to Youghal from 23 May 1860. From 1 October 1860 until May 1861 a temporary way was laid to the new terminus at Cork Summerhill, passing over the tunnel of the Dublin main line and convenient to the GS&WR Penrose Quay station, carriages on that section being hauled by Flemish horses. Following the laying of the permanent way the first scheduled first steam-hauled train for Youghal departed Cork Summerhill on 30 December 1861 at 09:45.

The progress on the line to Cobh was delayed by The Admiralty being concerned that the six span steel bridge to Fota Island and the Belvelly bridge to Great Island would be a hindrance to navigation. Transatlantic liners had been calling at Cobh since the 1850s and the traffic on the Cobh branch was to exceed than on the Youghal line. The C&YR seems to have been marketed as the Cork, Youghal and Queenstown Direct after this time, and seems to have been successful in capturing traffic from the Cork, Blackrock and Passage Railway and their ferries.

Lewis's financial over-ambition caught up with him in 1865, he was to be made bankrupt for the third time, owing £850,000. His only assets being C&YR shares this contributed to the GS&WR taking over operation of the railway from 1865 and buying it completely in 1866 for £310,000. Lewis was sent to jail and died in 1868 with this emerging to have been his third bankruptcy. Roney also was to die in 1868 before he was 60.

=== GS&WR ===
The GS&WR found the C&YR to be in a run-down condition but took steps to improve it to GS&WR standards, to the extent shareholders complained about the expenditures. The GS&WR implemented a junction from their line to the C&YR line in 1868. and doubled the line first to Cobh Junction in 1869, and then to Cobh in 1882, making in the main line with mileposts from Dublin Kingsbridge (Heuston). The line to Youghal then became the branch and the mileposts measured from Cobh Junction as zero. The GS&WR also paid substantially for a deep water harbour at Cobh.

From 1 July 1876 the Dublin to Cork daily mail train was extended to Cobh. It was known as the "American Mail" as it was possible to take mail from liner, transport it to Dublin for the steam Packets to mainland Britain and train to London, thereby cutting the delivery time by a day.

In 1893 the GS&WR closed their Dublin Penrose Quay station and the Summerhill (Note: Summerhill remained until 1927 with a weekly train visiting to maintain usage) station and replaced them with Cork Kent, originally known as Glanmire Road.

As with other railways Civil unrest took its toll with the bridges to Great Island destroyed on 8 August 1922. The Daytime mail trains were stopped from running through to Cobh after this point.

=== GSR, CIÉ and Irish Rail ===
The lines passed to the Great Southern Railways (GSR) with the amalgamation of 1925. Nationalisation into CIÉ followed some twenty years later in 1945 with control passing to Iarnród Éireann (Irish Rail) in 1987. Up to the 1960s Cobh had been the main departure point for Irish Emigrants to America, thereafter transatlantic air travel began to dominate and the liner trade died off. More recently this has been replaced to some extent by Cruise Ship tourists.

The last regular scheduled passenger train between Cobh Junction to Youghal ran on 2 February 1963 and was subsequently replaced by a bus service. On 30 July 2009 following a 35-year campaign the line was re-opened to Midleton at a cost of €75m. In July 2015 Irish Rail indicated they had no intention of re-opening to Youghal as funds would be better spent on the existing network. They indicated they supported a greenway as it would free them from existing maintenance costs whilst retaining a license to re-open the route in the unlikely event that became an option. By April 2020 a €15 million project to open the Midleton to Youghal Greenway had begun but was being delayed by the COVID-19 pandemic.

== Route ==
The initial main line runs in a relatively straight direction from Cork to Youghal some, 28 miles (45 km) to the east.

The branch to Cobh (formerly Queenstown) forks off south at Glounthaune (formerly Cobh Junction), some 6 miles (9.7 km) from Cork. Bridges and other works take the railway via the small Harpers Island and larger Fota Island to the port town of Cobh on Great Island, the largest island in Cork Harbour.

== Rolling stock ==
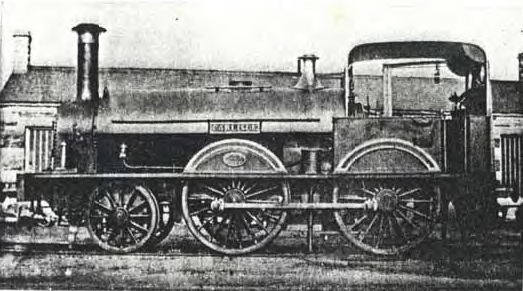
Cork & Youghal Railway 2-4-0ST in GS&WR ownership as No. 63

The C&YR bought seven 2-4-0ST with 5 feet 9 inches (1.75 m) driving wheels from Neilson and Company, and also three of the 2-2-2ST configuration with 6 feet 0 inches (1.83 m) driving wheels from the same company. All passed to the GS&WR on takeover. The company commenced with eight passenger coaches from Ashburys, Manchester, England. 20 freight wagons were built locally by Long & Co. of Youghal. Long also built a director's saloon carriage, named Crinoline. By the time of takeover the C&YR had accumulated 25 passenger carriages and 29 wagons, all of which passed to the GS&WR.

The Railway magazine note the GS&WR used the 0-4-4BT tank locomotives designed by Alexander McDonnell in 1883 as the preferred locomotive for the lines.

The second half of the 1950s seen the replacement of steam locomotives with diesel locomotives and railcars. The lines are currently worked by diesel railcars as part of the Cork Suburban Rail services.

== Services ==
The regular general service for the line remained fairly constant at about five scheduled services each way to Youghal, supplemented by freight and special trains. The Cobh branch has typically had an hourly service since 1863.

== Accidents ==
The line has been relatively free of accidents. The most serious was a collision at Summerhill in which over 100 people were injured, though without fatalities, where a train ran through a signal on 9 July 1882. The derailment of a MacDonald 0-4-4WT at points may have been due to the wheel profiles being rather sharp and the track being slightly out of gauge. A more recent accident was the overrun of a General Motors Diesel into the part of the Cobh station converted into a heritage centre - there were no injuries but one outcome was locomotives were required to have working speedometers or be retired from service until fixed.

Another accident took place on the C&YR line, at Dunkettle railway station, on 8 May 1911. An assistant platelayer, James Walsh, was struck by the buffer of the engine of an express passenger train travelling from Cork to Queenstown (Cobh). Walsh was transported to hospital in Cork City but died shortly afterwards.
