= Midleton railway station =

Railway station in County Cork, Ireland

Midleton Mainistir na Corann
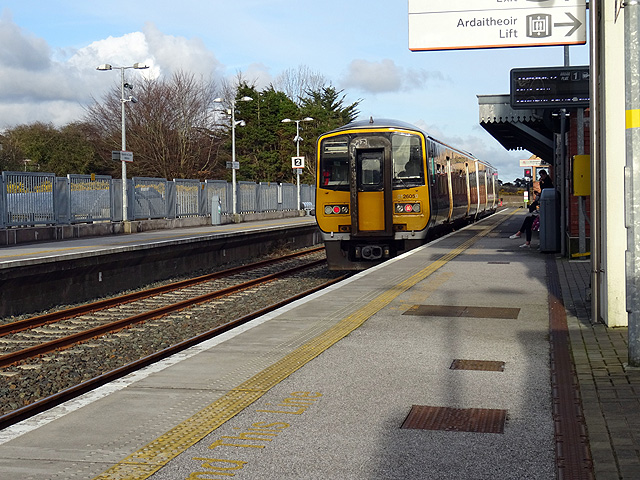
- A train for Cork stands in Midleton Station

General information
- Location: Midleton, County Cork; Ireland
- Coordinates: 51°55′16″N 8°10′33″W
- Owner: Iarnród Éireann
- Operator: Iarnród Éireann
- Platforms: 2
- Tracks: 2

Construction
- Structure type: At-grade
- Parking: Yes
- Accessible: Yes

Other information
- Station code: MDLTN (68)

History
- Opened: 10 November 1859
- Original company: Cork and Youghal Railway
- Pre-grouping: Great Southern and Western Railway
- Post-grouping: Great Southern Railways

Key dates
- 1963: Partially closed to passengers
- 1988: Fully closed
- 30 July 2009: Reopened

Services
Preceding station	Iarnród Éireann	Following station
Carrigtwohill towards Cork Kent	Commuter Cork–Midleton	Terminus
Former services
Preceding station	Disused railways	Following station
Carrigtwohill	Great Southern and Western Railway; Cork-Youghal	Mogeely
Route map
Location

Midleton railway station is a railway station situated in Midleton, a town in south-eastern County Cork, in Ireland.

It is the terminus station on the Cork to Midleton commuter service. Passengers can travel to Glounthaune station to transfer to Cobh.

It has been rebuilt and reopened as a terminus station of the Cork Suburban Railway Line. The station currently has 2 platforms. There is a train operating by the hour from the station.

== History ==
The station originally opened on 10 November 1859 and closed to all traffic in 1988. In 1963 the line was taken out of regular passenger service, from then the line carried daily goods trains, summer excursions and the beet in season. Goods were withdrawn in 1978, however the beet and excursions continued up until 1982. After 1982 the line was infrequently used for railtours, pilgrimages, company days out and finally a GAA special from Midleton in 1988.

In November 2005 the government announced plans for reopening under the Transport 21 initiative. In what was seen as an "election publicity stunt", the station was reopened on 26 May 2009 when Iarnród Éireann brought a special train to the station for a press conference held by a government minister. The press conference was held on board the train, but the train remained stationary. According to an Iarnród Éireann spokesman, "the train wasn't certified to carry passengers."

The line reopened for passenger traffic on 30 July 2009 with new Park and Ride facilities for commuters to Cork City.

== See also ==
- Cork Suburban Rail
- List of railway stations in Ireland
- Metropolitan Cork
