= List of coastal fortifications of County Cork =

A number of coastal fortifications were built in County Cork, Ireland, to defend the county's coastline, and in particular the strategic berths at Cork Harbour, Kinsale Harbour, Berehaven and Bantry Bay. The fortifications initially included medieval tower houses built to defend strategic points (14th-17th centuries), subsequent Martello towers designed to counter threatened French invasion (18th-19th centuries), and later Palmerston Forts to further improve coastal defence (19th century). The latter were subsequently updated with longer-range coastal artillery - to support the naval defence of the "Western Approaches" during the First World War (early 20th century).

== Cork Harbour ==
As one of the world's largest natural harbours, Cork Harbour's defences were built from medieval times up to the 20th century to defend the Port of Cork, Haulbowline naval yards, and Naval Air Station at Queenstown. Some of these defences were tested during the Siege of Cork (1690) and Fenian Rising (1867) - the harbour remains the home-port of the Irish Naval Service.

Name	Location	Type	Image	Era	Coordinates	Notes
Lower Harbour
Fort Davis (Carlisle)	Whitegate	Coastal defence fortification (Palmerston fort)		17th century (original castle); 19th century (reconstruction)	51.816°N 8.261°W	Derelict in some areas, but remains an active Defence Forces site.
Fort Meagher (Camden)	Crosshaven (Rams Head)	Coastal defence fortification (Palmerston fort)		16th century (original fort); 19th century (reconstruction)	51.808°N 8.279°W	Redeveloped as a heritage tourism site
Fort Mitchel (Westmoreland)	Spike Island	Star fort (later prison)		18th/19th century	51.835°N 8.286°W	Redeveloped as a heritage tourism attraction.
Fort Templebreedy (Battery)	Crosshaven (Church Bay)	Land battery		20th century	51.790°N 8.283°W	Demilitarised but remains Defence Forces property.
Cove Fort	Cobh (Cuskinny)	Land battery		18th century	51.8518°N 8.2771°W	Build in 1743 to replace temporary batteries defending the berths at Cobh and Haulbowline. Now the site of a Port of Cork facility and memorial garden.
Middle and Upper Harbour
Belvelly Castle	Belvelly	Norman tower house		14th or 15th century	51.888°N 8.302°W	In private ownership
Martello towers (x5)	Great Island (3), Haulbowline (1), Ringaskiddy (1)	Martello towers		19th century	Ringaskiddy:51.8284°N 8.3098°W; Haulbowline:51.8416°N 8.3074°W; Monning:51.8874°N 8.3202°W; Belvelly:51.8881°N 8.3047°W; Rossleague:51.8837°N 8.2764°W	Towers at Ringaskiddy, Haulbowline, Belvelly, Rossleague and Marino Point. The latter, "Monning Tower", was briefly held by Captain Mackey during the 1867 Fenian Rising. Haulbowline tower is now a museum store. One is a residence.
Blackrock Castle	Blackrock	Castle		17th century (original); 19th century (reconstruction)	51.9°N 8.4029°W	Though some of the 17th century structure remains, most features were built after a 19th-century fire, and it now houses an observatory
Dundanion Castle	Blackrock	Tudor tower house		16th century	51.8974°N 8.4204°W	Ruin on private land

== Kinsale Harbour and approaches ==
From medieval times, the harbour and berths at Kinsale were of strategic importance, and its defences were tested during the Battle of Kinsale (1601) and Williamite War (1690). Though declining in importance (relative to those at Cork Harbour) in the 18th and 19th centuries, several structures were in use until they were burned during the Irish Civil War (1922).

Name	Location	Type	Image	Era	Coordinates	Notes
Charles Fort (New Fort)	Kinsale (Summer Cove)	Coastal star fort		16th century (early castle); 17th century (current fort)	51.697°N 8.499°W	Though internals were burned-out during the Civil War, key structures are intact (or rebuilt) and operated by the OPW as a heritage tourism site
James Fort (Old Fort)	Kinsale (Castle Park)	Pentagonal fort		16th and 17th century	51.699°N 8.510°W	Damaged during the Williamite War (1690) and later left to ruin. Open to public.
Ringrone Castle	River Bandon (Ringrone)	Tower house		13th century	51.69°N 8.53°W	Built by the de Courcy family (Barons of Kinsale). Now a complete ruin
Old Head Castle	Old Head of Kinsale	Tower house		13th century	51.618°N 8.542°W	Another de Courcy castle built in defence of the Kinsale coast. Only some walls remain A nearby signal tower (1805) has since been restored.

== Bantry Bay and Berehaven Harbour ==
The deep-water berths at Bantry Bay and Berehaven Harbour were important from as early as the Nine Years' War and Siege of Dunboy in 1602, through the United Irishmen Rebellion and French Armada landings in the 1790s. The defences remained critical to support the Bantry Bay (anti-submarine) Naval Air Station during World War 1, and Berehaven "Treaty Port" was used by the Royal Navy fleet until it was relinquished in 1938 under the terms of the Anglo-Irish Treaty.

Name	Location	Type	Image	Era	Coordinates	Notes
Dunboy Castle	Beara Peninsula	Castle		15th or 16th century	51.633°N 9.924°W	An O'Sullivan Bere castle built to defend Bantry Bay and Berehaven harbour. Ruined since the Siege of Dunboy (1602)
Martello towers	Garnish Island, Whiddy Island, Bere Island	Martello towers		19th century	Garinish:51.736°N 9.542°W; Whiddy:51.682°N 9.519°W; Bere:51.634°N 9.849°W	Built to defend the deep water berths of Bantry Bay, four towers were built on Bere Island (2 remain), with others on Whiddy and Garnish.

== Baltimore and Roaring Water Bay ==
The defences at Baltimore, Roaring Water Bay and surrounding islands were largely built by landed families from the 14th to 17th centuries. Some were relinquished (but later returned) after the Nine Years' War (1603) and involved in the Sack of Baltimore (1631).

Name	Location	Type	Image	Era	Coordinates	Notes
Dún na Séad	Baltimore, County Cork	Tower house		14th to 17th century	51.483°N 9.373°W	Built on an earlier Anglo-Norman structure, Dún na Séad castle (Fort of the Jewels) was an O'Driscoll stronghold
Dún na Long and Dún an Óir Castles	Cléire and Sherkin Islands	Tower houses		15th to 17th century	Sherkin:51.477°N 9.402°W; Cléire:51°26.28′N 9°30.86′W	Built by the O'Driscolls in the same period as the island's friary, Sherkin's Dún na Long (Fort of the Ships) and Cléire's Dún an Óir (Fort of Gold, pictured) were intended to defend the approaches to Baltimore and Roaring Water Bay

== See also ==
- Coastal fortifications of Jersey
- Coastal fortifications of Malta
- Coastal fortifications of New Zealand
- Coastal fortifications of the United States
- List of castles in Ireland
- List of National Monuments in County Cork
- Martello towers in the Greater Dublin Area
