= Old Town Hall, Cobh =

19th century building in Ireland

Old Town Hall
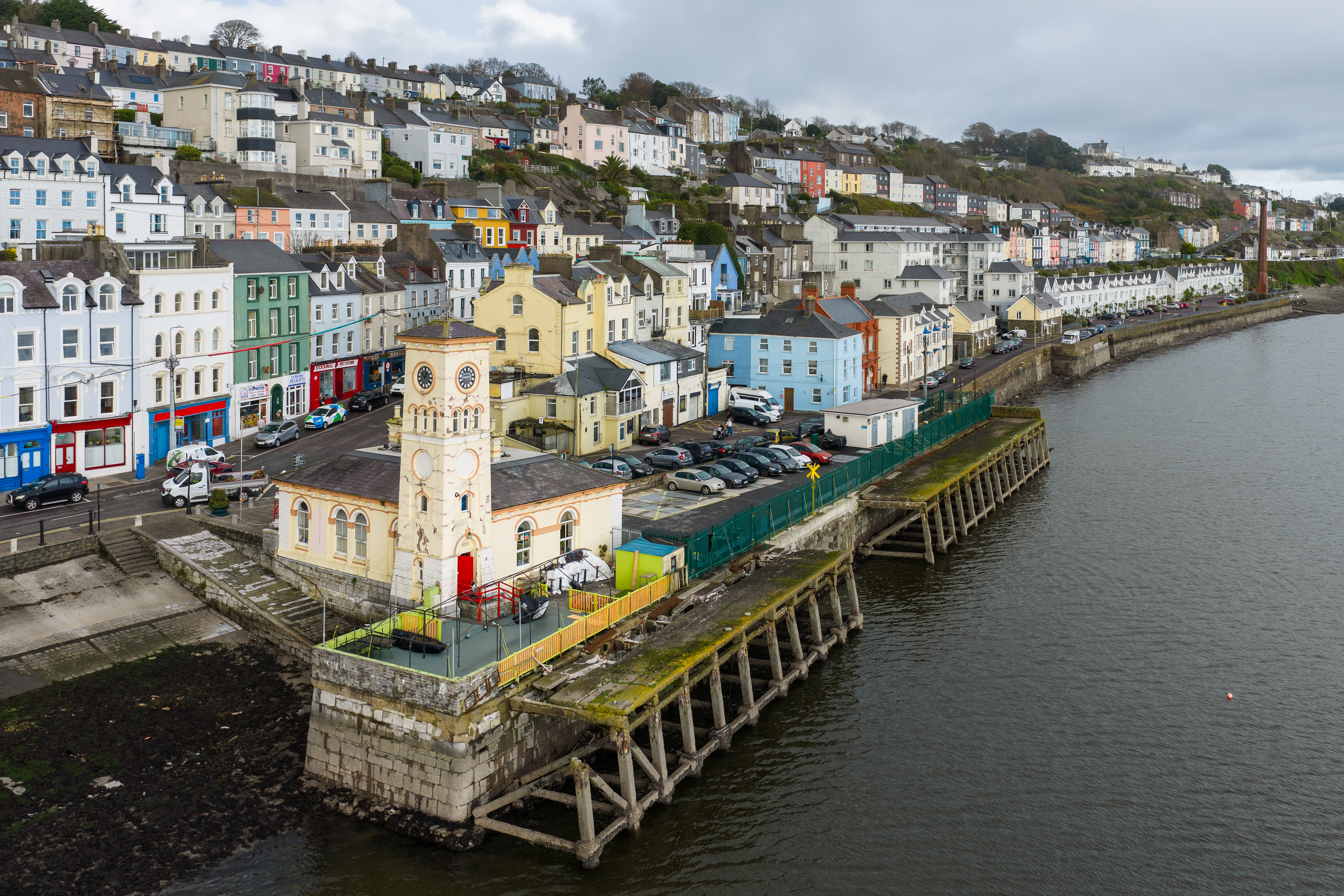
- Aerial view of the building from ocean side
- Interactive map of Old Town Hall
- Location: Cobh, Ireland
- Coordinates: 51.8502°N 8.2910°W
- Built: 1874

The Old Town Hall is a 19th-century building in Cobh, Ireland. Situated slightly east of the town center, in what is referred to as Lynch's Quay or East Beach, it faces Cork Harbour. It is included in the Record of Protected Structures maintained by Cork County Council.

== Design ==
The single-floor building is based on square plan, with slanted roof covered with slates. Two distinct chimneys dominate the center of the roof. A clock tower is situated in the south-west corner of the building, and has three stages. The building is rendered in peach color and replacement PVC windows and doors have been installed. As of 2025, none of the clocks were in operation.

== History ==
Constructed c. 1870, the building originally served as the Cork Harbour Commissioners' Office, and later used as the Urban District Council Office. It has also been referred to as the Old Cobh Town Hall and Clock Tower Gallery. Since 2010, a Chinese restaurant has been operating in the building, with a 21-year lease. In 2015 the property, including the waterfront jetty, was put up for sale with the guiding price of EUR 350,000.

A monument outside of the building commemorates the "Irish Poplar tragedy", a marine incident which resulted in the death of five people in Cork Harbour during December 1942. A further memorial, which incorporates an anchor, is dedicated to "all Irish seafarers who have served this island nation".

== Restoration ==
In April 2025, an agreement was made by the co-owners, the Port of Cork and Cork County Council, regarding restoration works. The plan was met with criticism claiming the works planned were too superficial.
