= Cove Fort, County Cork =

Cove Fort
- Near Cobh in Cork Harbour in Ireland
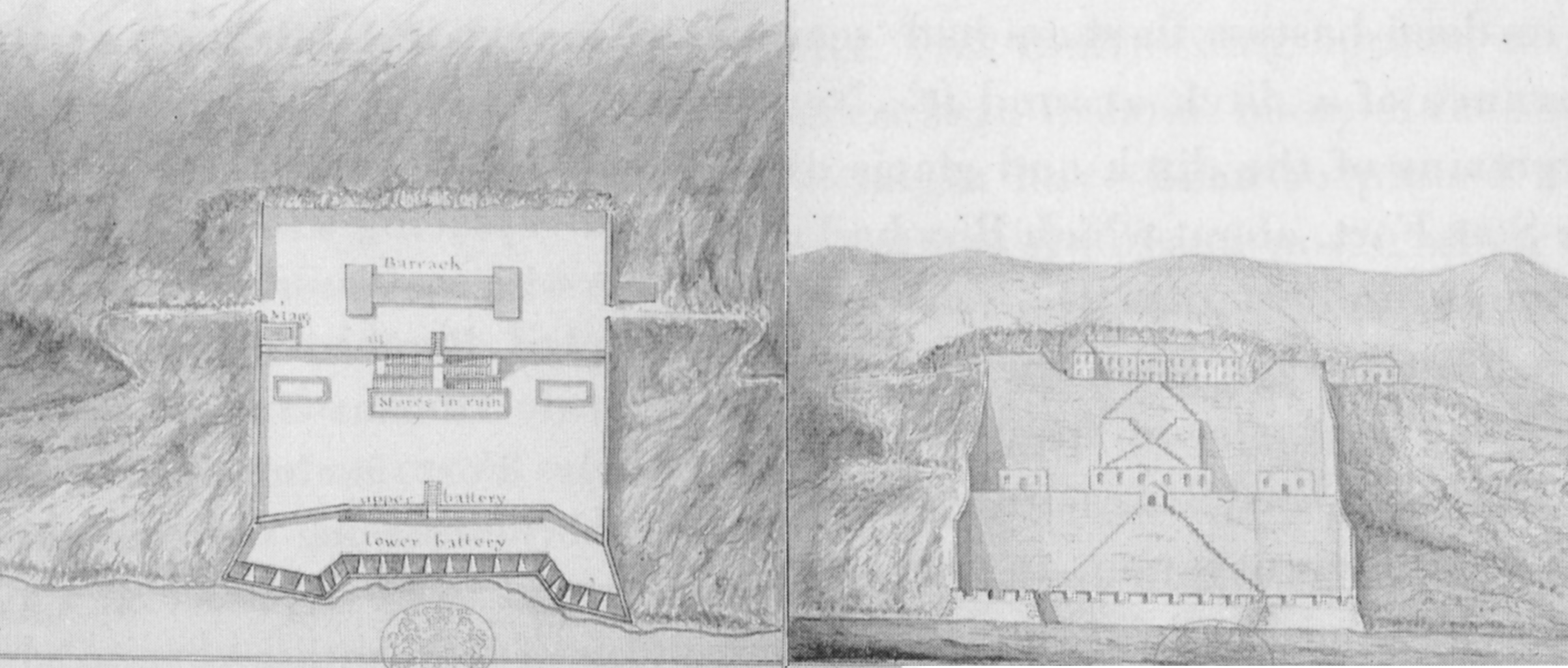
- Plan and elevation of Cove Fort from a 1777 survey by Charles Vallancey

Site information
- Type: Coastal defence fortification
- Open to the public: Partial
- Primary uses: Land battery, barracks, military hospital

Location
- Coordinates: 51.8518°N 8.2771°W
- Area: 2.5 acres

Site history
- Built: 1743
- In use: Until 19th century (as battery & barracks), 20th century (as hospital)

Cove Fort is a small bastioned land battery to the east of Cobh in County Cork, Ireland. Built as a coastal defence fortification in 1743, on instruction of the then Vice-Admiral of the Coast, it replaced a number of temporary coastal artillery batteries which defended Cork Harbour.

The seaward fortifications included a demi-bastioned frontage with three tiers of gun emplacements commanding the harbour's main shipping channel and defending the naval yards at Haulbowline. While the landward walls included musketry flanking-galleries, later 18th century reports criticised the fact that the fort was overlooked by higher ground to the rear and that planned landward bastion defences had not been built. A 1763 report recorded the fort as having a number of 24-pounder long guns, and a later survey by Charles Vallancey records a small detachment of Royal Irish Artillery at the site. By 1811 there were 20 or more 24-pounder guns in place.

In the 19th century the harbour's other defences were expanded at Fort Westmoreland (Spike Island), Fort Carlisle (Whitegate), and Fort Camden (Crosshaven), and by the end of the Napoleonic Wars Cove Fort came to house a naval and military hospital. By the 1830s the site was largely given-over to this use, and though used as a barracks, was no longer used primarily for battery defence. The "Queenstown Military Hospital" remained in operation until after World War I.

The area of the fort now houses a Port of Cork operations building and harbour pilot station, and is the site of a park (Bishop Roche Park), and the Cobh Titanic Memorial Garden. The latter includes a glass structure which has been engraved with the names of the 123 passengers who boarded at Cobh – RMS Titanic's last port of call. The memorial garden has a line-of-sight to the last anchorage point of the Titanic, close to Roche's Point at the mouth of the harbour.

== See also ==
- List of coastal fortifications of County Cork
