= Rocky Island (Cork) =

Island in Cork Harbour, Ireland

Native name: Oileán Cathail
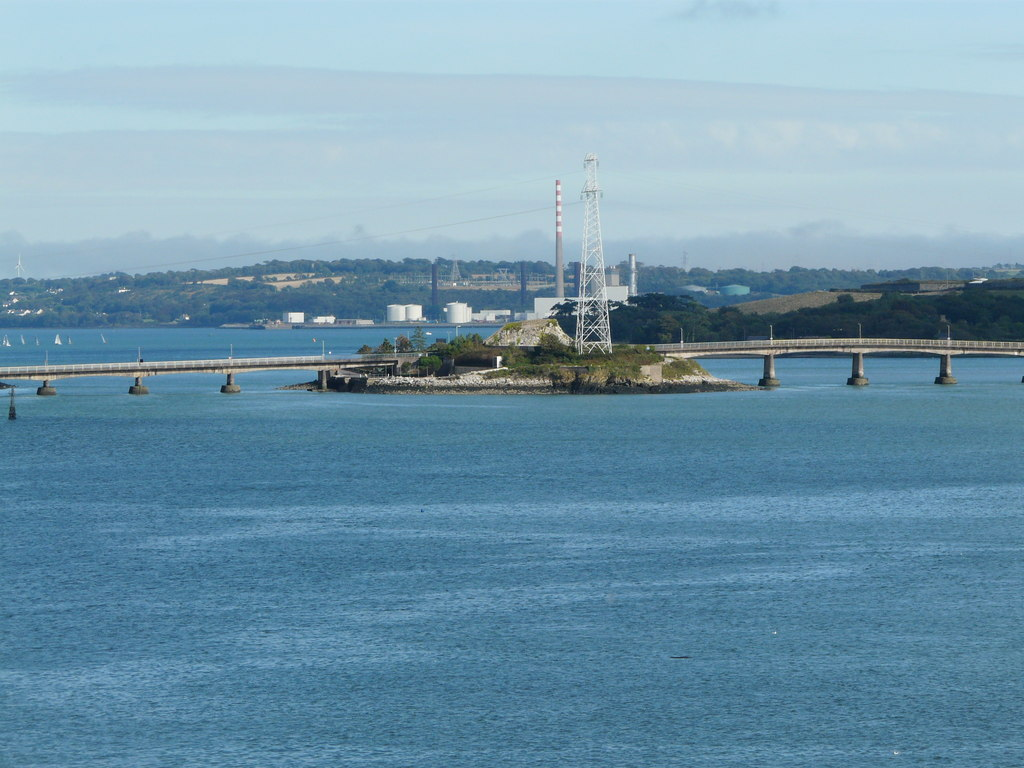
- Rocky Island

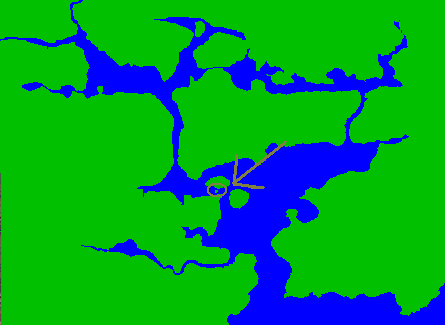
- Location of Rocky Island within Cork Harbour

- Location within island of Ireland

Geography
- Location: County Cork, Ireland
- Coordinates: 51°50′14″N 8°18′05″W

Administration
- Ireland
- Province: Munster
- County: Cork
- Water body: Cork Harbour

Rocky Island (Irish: Oileán Cathail) is located in Cork Harbour, Ireland. Situated between the naval base on Haulbowline Island and the mainland, a gunpowder magazine was constructed on the island by the Board of Ordnance in 1808. Used for military storage into the 20th Century, the stores were re-purposed for use by Irish Steel until 2002. It was redeveloped between 2005 and 2007, and is now home to the Island Crematorium, the first crematorium in the Republic of Ireland outside of Dublin.

Two bridges connect Rocky Island with the mainland and with Haulbowline. The bridges carry the single lane L2545 roadway.

== Island crematorium ==
In the early 19th century, the centre of the rocky landscape of the island was excavated and a matching pair of triple-vaulted magazines were constructed; the magazine compound was hidden behind a perimeter of natural rock and a rocky outcrop was retained between the two magazines, on which a watch tower was built. One of the two magazines remains, accessed by a tunnel through the rock; inside the compound there is a courtyard at either end, linked by pair of passageways which flank the main magazine. Following its redevelopment as a crematorium, the central vault of the magazine serves as a 'spiritual space' for funeral services, the north vault contains the 'family and refreshment areas' and the south vault contains the 'staff areas' (including the cremator).

== Gallery ==
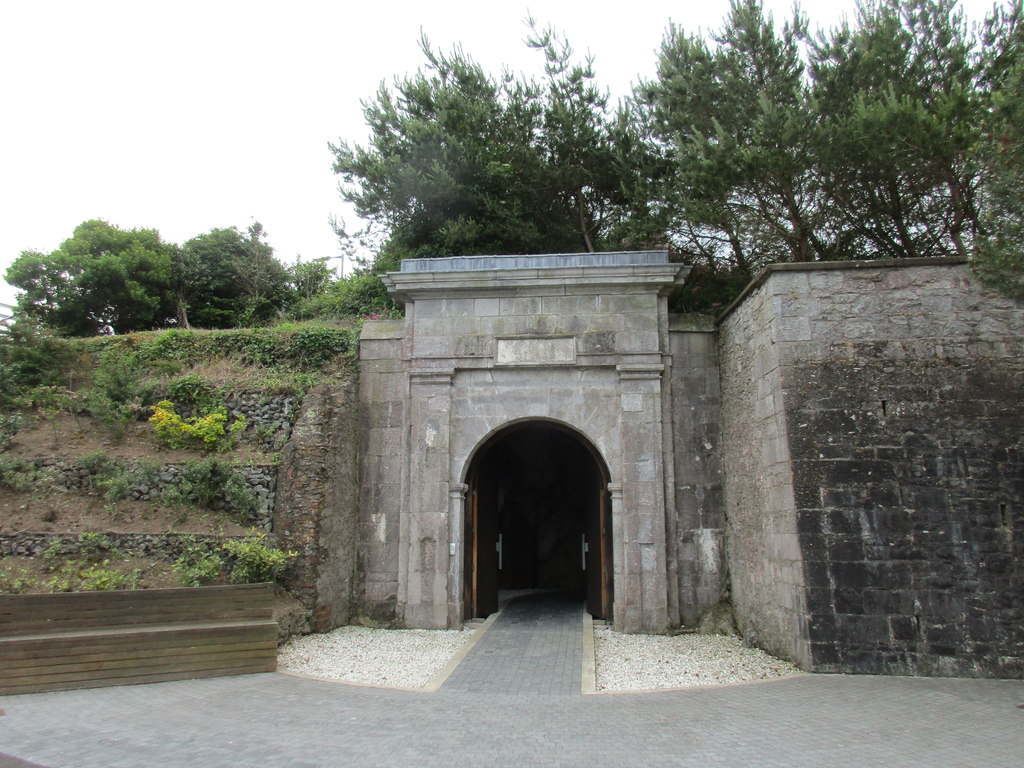
Entrance to the former magazine compound

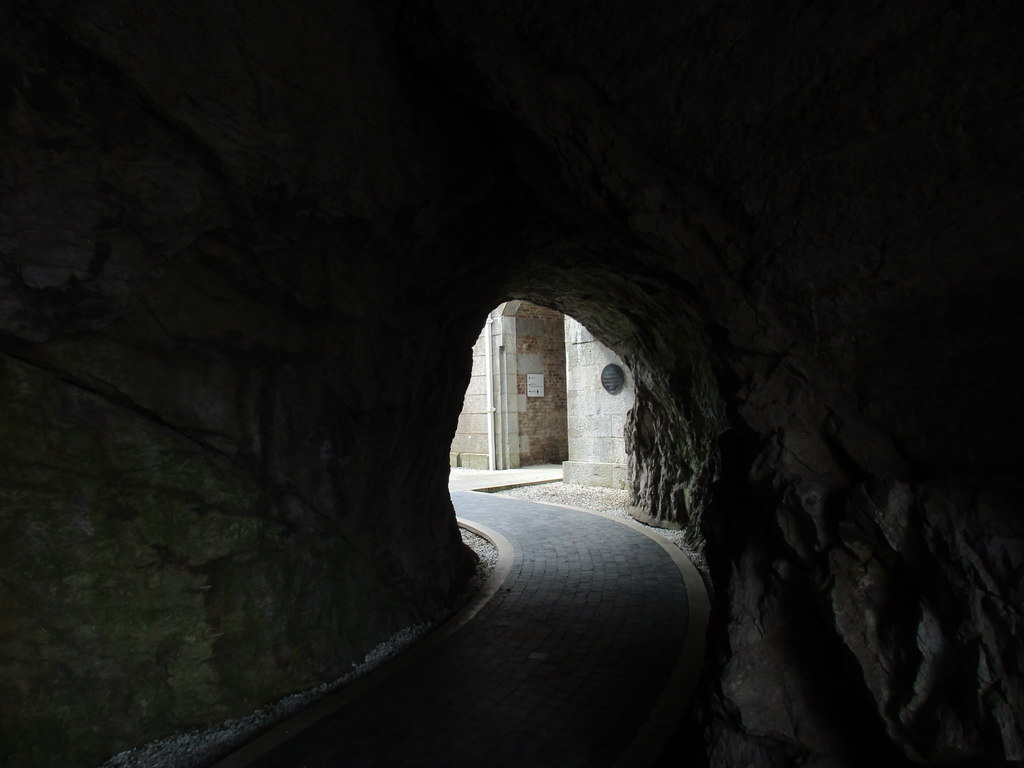
Tunnel leading from the entrance to the courtyard

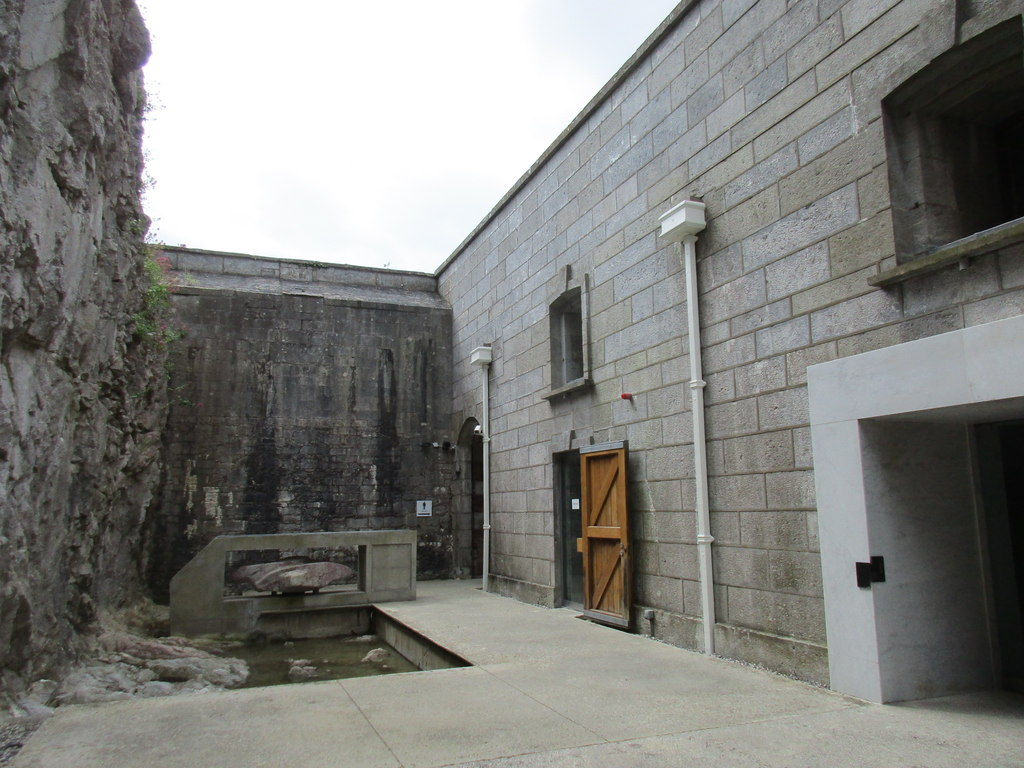
Courtyard and exterior of the magazine building

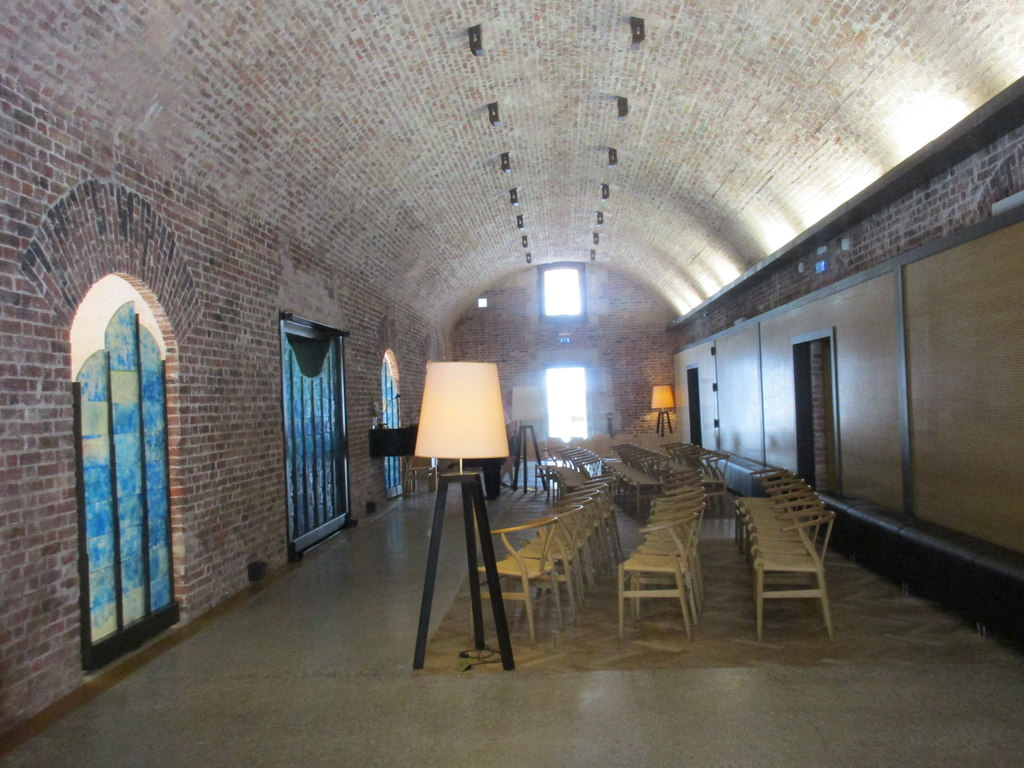
'Spiritual space' inside the former magazine
