= Cove Fort (disambiguation) =

Cove Fort is a 19th-century defensive fortification in Millard County, Utah, United States.

Cove Fort may also refer to:

- Cove Fort, County Cork, an 18th-century fort and land battery in Cork Harbour, Ireland

== See also ==
- Bayard's Cove Fort, a 16th-century artillery blockhouse in Dartmouth, England
- Coue Fort, a synonym of the grape variety Chenin blanc
