= Swansea Cork ferry =

10-hour ferry cross linking Swansea, Wales with the Port of Cork, Ireland

The Swansea Cork ferry was a 10-hour ferry crossing that linked Swansea in Wales with the Port of Cork in Ireland. The ferry route was last operated by Fastnet Line from 2010 to 2012, although no commercial passenger sailings took place after 2011. Between 1987 and 2006 the service was operated by Swansea Cork Car Ferries Ltd. Prior to the revival of the Cork–Swansea route by Swansea Cork Car Ferries Ltd. the former Irish semi-state owned ferry company, British & Irish Steam Packet Company which became known simply as the B+I Line which had operated the route from 1969 until 1979. In 1979 the B+I Line decided to switch the Cork–Swansea service over to a Cork–Pembroke Dock service instead. Prior to B+I Line's Cork–Swansea ferry, they had a previous ferry service that sailed from Cork to Fishguard in Wales. Over the years numerous ships had different departure points from Cork. Originally, the ferry came right up into Cork city centre and would have docked across from Penrose House (original Headquarter premises of The City of Cork Steam Packet Company) at Penrose Quay and in the 1970s ferries departed Cork from a new Ferry Terminal based down stream at Tivoli Docks alongside a large container terminal. From around the early 1980s onwards ferries would later depart from yet another new passenger car Ferry Terminal based at Ringaskiddy Deepwater Berth in the lower part of Cork Harbour.

== Swansea Cork Ferries (1987–2006) ==
From 1987 to 2006, the Swansea–Cork ferry was operated by Swansea Cork Car Ferries Ltd., an Ireland-based company. The ferry operated year-round. The ten-hour journey across the Celtic Sea was usually covered by an overnight sailing arriving in Ringaskiddy early in the morning, sailing back to Swansea during daytime in months July and August, and at night the rest of the year. The service was operated by one passenger ferry which could accommodate automobiles, camper vans, and goods vehicles, and had on-board cabins.

=== Cessation in 2006 ===
The service ceased operating after the 2006 season. After disposing of their most recent vessel, the MV Superferry, and failing to find a suitable replacement, Swansea Cork Ferries Ltd announced that they would not be operating the service during the 2007 summer season. There was also no service during 2008 or 2009.

Thirty staff in Swansea, 45 in Ireland and 120 ship staff were laid off when the company ceased operations after 2006. Press reports show that the loss of the passenger ferry service dealt a blow to the economies of both South West Wales and the County Cork area in Ireland. Since Swansea Cork Ferries started operating the ferry service in 1987, the company brought 2,850,000 passengers and 700,000 cars into Cork. Tourism sources in West Cork said that the ferry's loss resulted in a 30% drop in tourists coming into the region from Britain, particularly hurting hotels, B&Bs, restaurants and camping centres. The loss cost Ireland's Cork and Kerry region an estimate £24.4m (€35 million) based on a study by University College Cork in 2007, with the west of Cork being particularly badly hit because its out-of-the-way pubs, restaurants and hotels not served by buses or trains relied heavily on car ferry users. In Swansea and South West Wales the hotel, pub, restaurant and B&B trade has been hit by the loss of Irish visitors—an influx that in 2006 brought £65m to the Welsh economy. The route was also heavily used by English and continental European tourists as a "relatively close to London" route to the Republic of Ireland, with many travellers stopping overnight in Swansea.

== Campaign for reinstatement ==
Two local businessmen in West Cork started a campaign and website in April 2008 to highlight the impact of the continuing lack of the Ferry service, www.bringbacktheswanseacorkferry.com; this was superseded by a new site at www.peoplesferry.com. The old site featured an e-petition where people affected by the suspension of the ferry could make their views known, and the new site carried news of the new ferry service, plus a history of the campaign.

Following a year of campaigning, including work by some local politicians and organisations including the bringbacktheswanseacorkferry campaign and West Cork Tourism, a passenger and freight ferry service between Cork and Swansea was established. It began March 2010 and run by a new company, Fastnet Line, financed by a 3 million euro co-op 'Pledge' system, a bank loan and other investment capital.

== Fastnet Line (2010–2012) ==
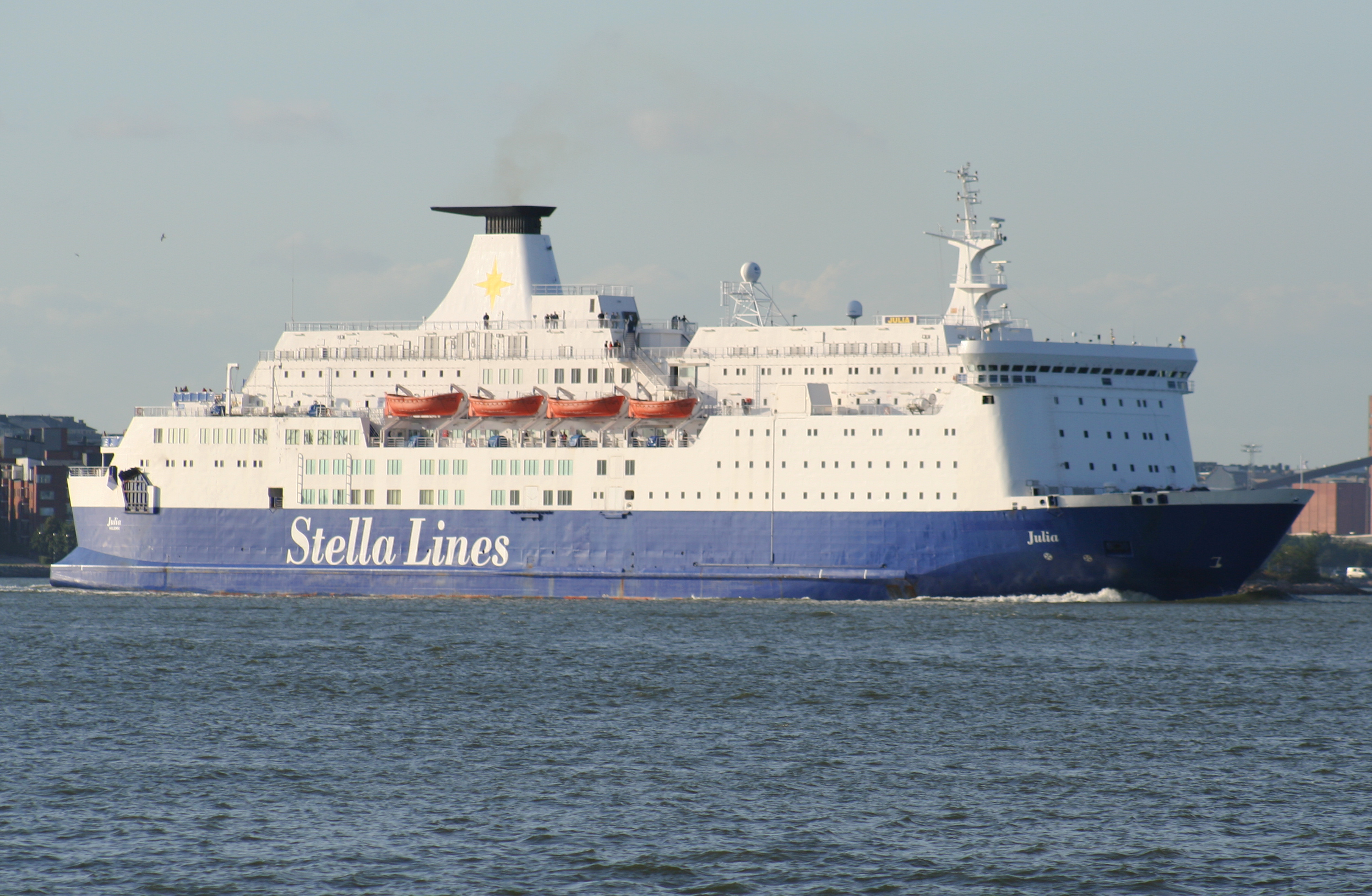
MS Julia outside Helsinki, August 2008

After a long process of negotiation, including approval by the Finnish courts, it was announced in mid-September 2009 that the ship to run the new service, MS Julia, had been purchased for Fastnet Line. She was built in 1982 and had previously served routes in the Scandinavian peninsula. The Julia has 10 decks with a capacity for approximately 440 cars and 30 freight vehicles, and 1,860 passengers. Passenger facilities include 300 passenger cabins, a cinema, a children's play area, restaurants and bars. MV Julia left Finland en route for Cork on 17 September 2009, calling at the Port of Swansea for berthing trials along the way. She wintered in the Port of Cork before leaving in January 2010 for dry-docking, safety certification, and some minor modifications for compliance with Irish regulations in Swansea. The first voyage departed from Swansea to Ringaskiddy at 21:50 on Wednesday 10 March 2010.

On 3 November 2011, it was announced all services would be cancelled until April 2012, due to "higher than expected fuel prices". On 2 February 2012, it was revealed that the ferry service would be closed permanently. The owners, West Cork Tourism Co-operative Society, stated that aid rules and "red tape" prevented them relaunching the Fastnet Line service despite pledges of financial support.
