= Martello towers in the Greater Dublin Area =

List of Martello towers in the Greater Dublin Area

29 Martello towers and battery installations were constructed or partially constructed in the Greater Dublin Area between 1803 and 1808. The towers were intended to act as a deterrent against a foreign invasion by Napoleon and his French Armies as well as being used as general lookout posts. In later years, towers were also used as coast guard stations, lookout stations to prevent smuggling and as other general purpose military installations by various British and Irish defence forces.

The Killiney bay towers were specifically planned following a 1797 survey by a Major La Chaussée who was employed by the British administration to survey the area and plot out points of weakness and potential locations for military defensive installations.

Number	Type	Image	Location	Council Area and County	Date	Ownership	Notes
1 North	Tower		Red Rock, Sutton; 53.3695671°N 6.0970874°W	Fingal County Council, County Dublin	1804	Private dwelling house	At a key strategic point as it faced Sutton Creek which was often used by boats wishing to avoid the silted up harbour approaching the River Liffey mouth. It was also a deterrent to smugglers and acted as a general lookout post for the North Dublin Bay area. The tower also included a clay boundary ditch around the half acre site and 11 large boundary stones.
2 North	Tower		Howth East Pier; 53.3878207°N 6.0650752°W	Fingal County Council, County Dublin	1804	Fingal County Council	Ye Olde Hurdy Gurdy Museum of Vintage Radio operates from the tower. Built on the site of an ancient Promontory fort complex.
3 North	Double tower		Ireland's Eye; 53.4082498°N 6.0701993°W	Fingal County Council, County Dublin	1804	Corporate Ownership	Acquired by Tetrarch Investment Group upon its acquisition of the Howth Estate in 2019. Access to the island is still open to the public
4 North	Tower		Carrickhill, Portmarnock; 53.435976°N 6.122295°W	Fingal County Council, County Dublin	1804	Private dwelling house	
5 North	Tower		Robswall, Malahide; 53.447712°N 6.135609°W	Fingal County Council, County Dublin	1805	Private dwelling house	Often named Hick's Tower after the architect who extended and modernised the property as well as contributing its trademark conical shaped roof
6 North	Tower		Balcarrick, Donabate; 53.478328°N 6.115369°W	Fingal County Council, County Dublin	1805	Private ownership	The tower is derelict and vacant and in poor condition.
7 North	Tower		Tower Bay, Portrane; 53.489900°N 6.097187°W	Fingal County Council, County Dublin	1804	Private dwelling house	In good and habitable condition.
8 North	Tower		Drumanagh, Loughshinny; 53.540614°N 6.078161°W	Fingal County Council, County Dublin	1804	Private ownership	The tower is located on one of the most important archaeological sites in Ireland, It is vacant and derelict and in poor condition.
9 North	Tower		Rush; 53.521038°N 6.076363°W	Fingal County Council, County Dublin	1804	Private dwelling house	Has been used as a main dwelling and as a holiday home in recent times
10 North	Tower		Red Island, Skerries; 53.584602°N 6.102461°W	Fingal County Council, County Dublin	1804	Fingal County Council	Vacant and derelict with windows and doors blocked up however it is still in moderately good condition owing to recent use as part of a holiday camp up until the 1980s.
11 North	Tower		Shenick Island, Skerries; 53.573745°N 6.085723°W	Fingal County Council, County Dublin	1805	Fingal County Council	
12 North	Tower		Balbriggan (Tankardstown); 53.615993°N 6.183294°W	Fingal County Council, County Dublin	1804	Fingal County Council	In extremely poor condition and the most at risk of any of the towers in the Dublin area. Previously in use as part of the adjacent coast guard station
N/A North			Millmount Fort, Drogheda; 53.711656°N 6.349517°W	Louth County Council, County Louth	1808	Charity (Old Drogheda Society)	
1 South	Tower		Bray esplanade 53.201315°N 6.096604°W	Wicklow County Council, County Wicklow	1804	N/A - demolished	Demolished - various photos and drawings still exist showing the tower on the beach between the centre of the strand and Bray Head.
2 South	Tower and battery		Bray on an elevated site guarding the south bank of the River Dargle; 53.206826°N 6.101694°W	Wicklow County Council, County Wicklow	1804	Private dwelling house, battery demolished	Bono and Ali Hewson owned the property for a period in the 1980s.
3 South	Tower		Townlands of Cork Great/Corke Abbey just north of the River Dargle; 53.213058°N 6.101821°W	Dún Laoghaire–Rathdown County Council, County Dublin	1804	N/A - destroyed	Lost to coastal erosion and area currently lies circa 50m off the current shoreline submerged. Much of the stone has been taken for other uses in buildings around Bray although some of the large granite blocks remain submerged beneath the water. Marked on a map dated 1836.
4 South	Tower and two batteries	No photo available	Maghera Point, Shankill near Bray; 53.230605°N 6.107206°W	Dún Laoghaire–Rathdown County Council, County Dublin	1804	N/A - destroyed	Eroded but part of remains of the large granite blocks and boulders still lie strewn on the sea shore and surrounding area and can be seen on a clear day. Also included a defensive redoubt. Located close to Rosedale House which still stands as of 2020. The remains of the tower are clearly mapped on an OSI Map of 1897. Clear photos exist of the tower in the Lawrence collection prior to its collapse.
5 South	Battery only	No photo available	Killiney (Shanganagh); 53.253271°N 6.113885°W	Dún Laoghaire–Rathdown County Council, County Dublin	1804	N/A - dismantled	Remains of the battery still can be seen near the shore. A Martello Tower was planned but never actually built or possibly only the foundations and part of the first floor were built before being dismantled or demolished in 1815.
6 South	Tower and battery	No photo available	Killiney beach (Loughlinstown River); 53.249872°N 6.112837°W	Dún Laoghaire–Rathdown County Council, County Dublin	1804	Private dwelling house, battery demolished	Enoch Tower - still in use with vertical floor additions added by Victor Enoch, a martello tower aficionado and prominent member of Dublin's Jewish Community who authored a book called The Martello Towers of Ireland
7 South	Tower and battery		Killiney Hill (Tara Hill); 53.256391°N 6.118252°W	Dún Laoghaire–Rathdown County Council, County Dublin	1804	Private dwelling house with battery restored	Enfilade tower
8 South	Battery only	No photo available	Ballybrack/Limekiln, site of old Killiney Railway Station; 53.259201°N 6.112837°W	Dún Laoghaire–Rathdown County Council, County Dublin	1804	N/A - demolished	Removed c.1853 for the construction of the railway line although some out buildings remained up until the 1960s. Much of the stone was used to build a tunnel under the railway line to the beach.
9 South	Double tower and battery		Dalkey Island; 53.271569°N 6.085130°W	Dún Laoghaire–Rathdown County Council, County Dublin	1804	Dún Laoghaire–Rathdown County Council	Both tower and battery still standing and in moderate condition as of 2020.
10 South	Tower	No photo available	Bullock Harbour/Bartra, Harbour Road, Dalkey; 53.283322°N 6.103696°W	Dún Laoghaire–Rathdown County Council, County Dublin	1804	Private dwelling house	Listed for sale in 2016 at €1.8m after extensive renovations by architect Simone Stephenson and eventually sold for €1.78m.
11 South	Tower and battery		James Joyce Tower and Museum, Sandycove; 53.288666°N 6.113625°W	Dún Laoghaire–Rathdown County Council, County Dublin	1804	Museum	Well used museum and event space in excellent condition near to the Forty Foot.
12 South	Tower and battery		People's Park, Dún Laoghaire/Glasthule; 53.290039°N 6.127494°W	Dún Laoghaire–Rathdown County Council, County Dublin	1804	N/A - demolished	Demolished and the rubble was used to fill in a nearby quarry. The Tower was located on a high rocky outcrop in the corner of People's Park above a lower battery located on Scotsman's Bay. The tower was removed sometime around 1850 possibly due to undermining from quarrying and the need for stone in the area. Its position is clearly identified on an 1837 map of Dublin and Environs where it is called Glassdool Tower.
13 South	Tower and battery	No photo available	Dún Laoghaire Harbour; 53.29457°N 6.13716°W	Dún Laoghaire–Rathdown County Council, County Dublin	1804	N/A - demolished	Removed c.1836 for the construction of the Railway Line. It was not in the way of the railway line but possibly was destabilised and undermined following quarrying of material in the immediate vicinity of the tower. When the harbour was expanded the remaining fragments were finally removed.
14 South	Tower		Seapoint; 53.297849°N 6.159815°W	Dún Laoghaire–Rathdown County Council, County Dublin	1803	Dún Laoghaire–Rathdown County Council	Formerly the headquarters of the Genealogical Society of Ireland and now used as changing rooms for the beach.
15 South	Double tower		Blackrock/Booterstown (Williamstown); 53.306537°N 6.188563°W	Dún Laoghaire–Rathdown County Council, County Dublin	1804	Dún Laoghaire–Rathdown County Council	In moderate condition and due to be restored and brought into commercial and community use.
16 South	Double tower		Sandymount Strand; 53.325196°N 6.206892°W	Dublin City Council, County Dublin	1804	Private ownership	Dublin City Council have expressed an interest in acquiring the tower. Significant additions and extensions were made in the 1990s and 2000s to bring the tower into use as a restaurant, café and craft brewery

== See also ==
- List of coastal fortifications of County Cork

== Sources ==
- Bolton, J., Carey, T., Goodbody, R. & Clabby, G. (2012) The Martello Towers of Dublin. (Dublin: Dún Laoghaire-Rathdown & Fingal County Council).
- Clements, William H. (1998) Towers of Strength: Story of Martello Towers. (London: Pen & Sword). ISBN 978-0-85052-679-0.
- MacKay, Art (2016) Blockhouses & Martello Towers
