= Tivoli, Cork =

Tivoli
- Suburb
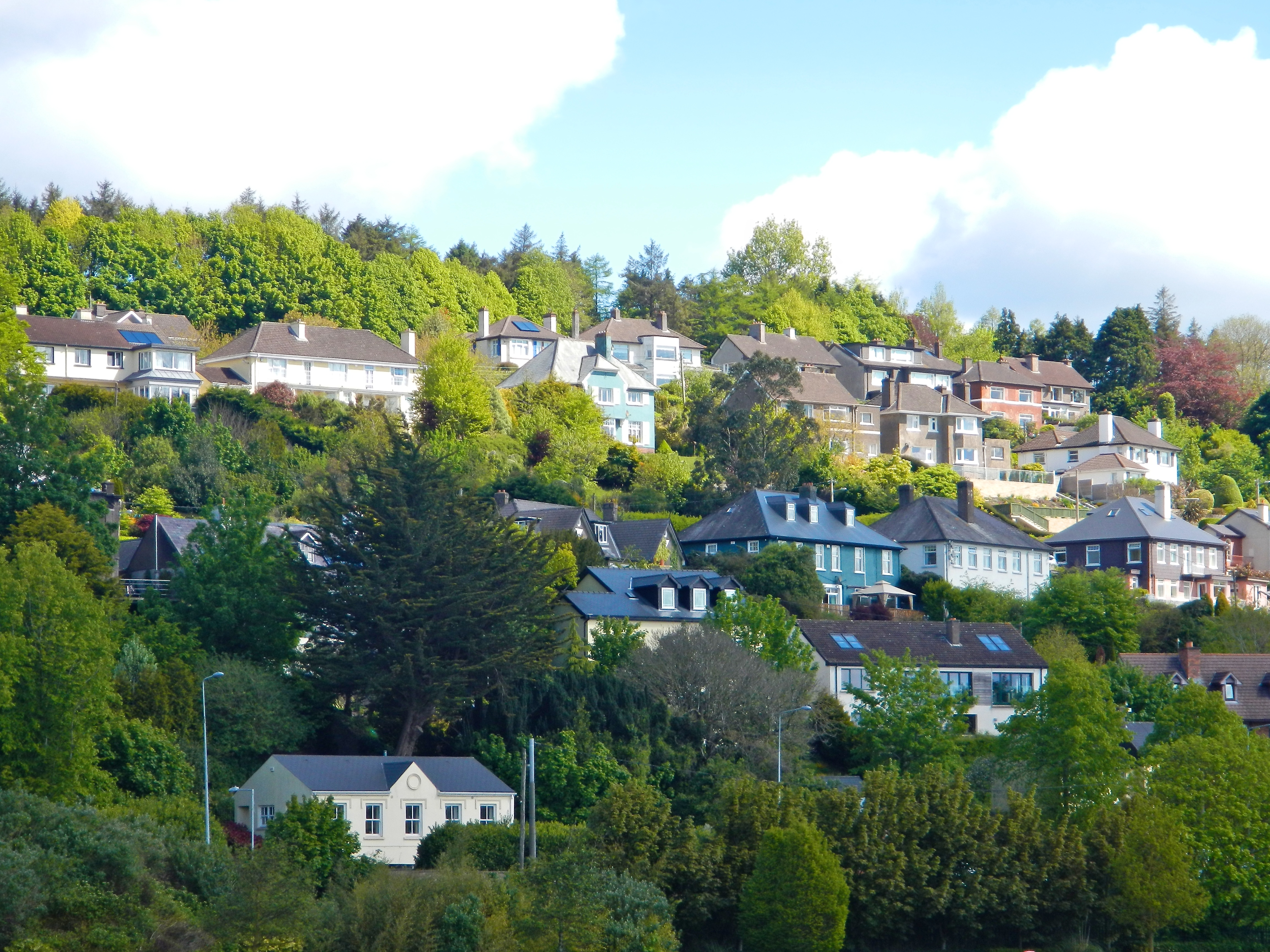
- Tivoli, Cork, Ireland

- Location in Ireland
- Coordinates: 51°54′19″N 8°24′50″W
- Country: Ireland
- Province: Munster
- County: Cork
- Time zone: UTC+0 (WET)
  - Summer (DST): UTC-1 (IST (WEST))
- Irish Grid Reference: W715726

Tivoli is an eastern suburb of Cork in Ireland. Tivoli is in the Dáil constituency of Cork North-Central. A station on the former Cork and Youghal Railway served the area between the 1860s and 1930s.

The area is home to a number of bed and breakfast establishments and the Silver Springs Hotel. The cedar trees, still growing in the area, were reputedly planted by Sir Walter Raleigh, who lived there briefly.

Tivoli's docks, part of the Port of Cork, provide container handling, facilities for oil, livestock and ore, as well as a roll-on/roll-off ferry ramp. The docks are a significant point of entry for imported motor vehicles. The docks are to be phased out as the Port of Cork moves further downriver to the Ringaskiddy area.

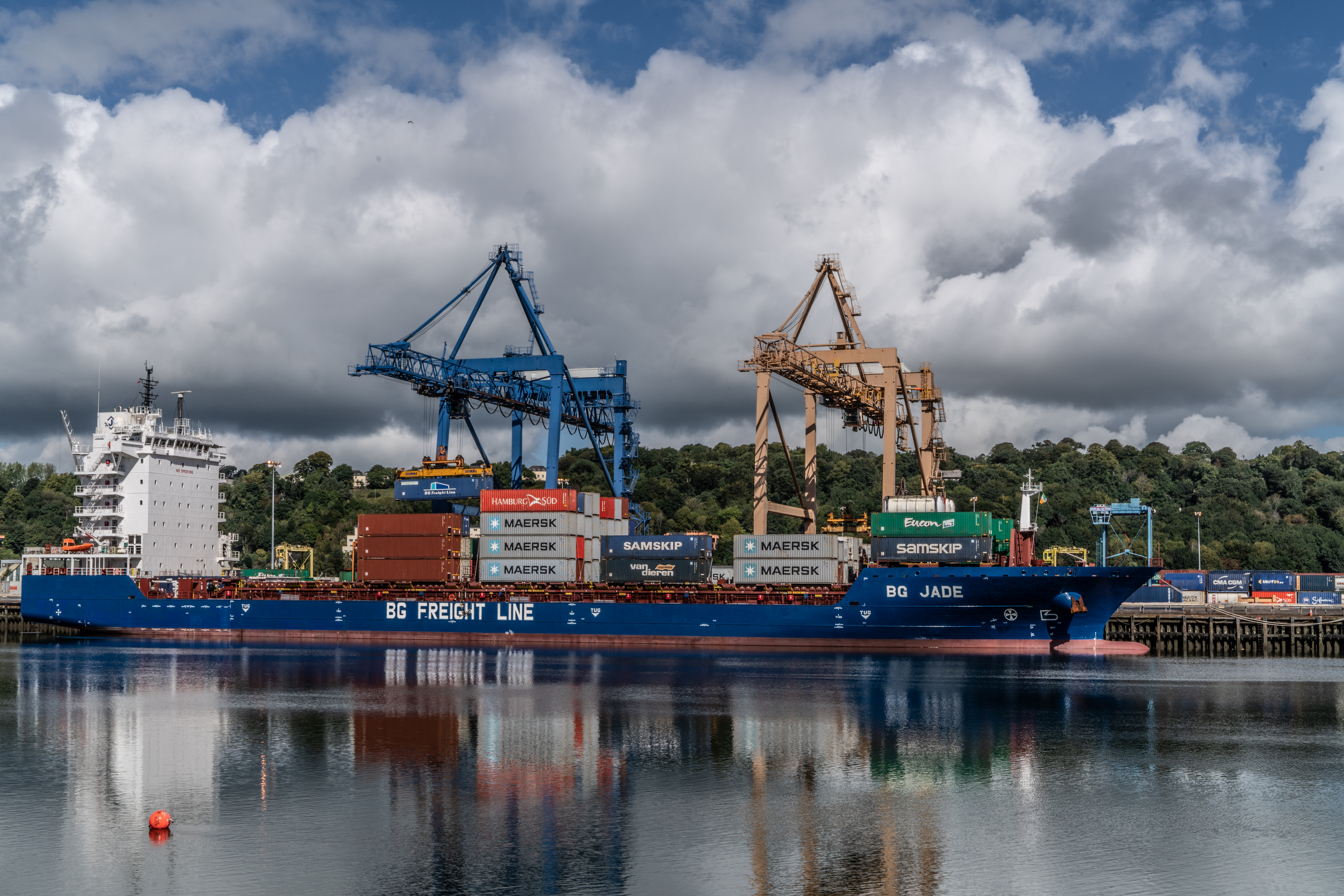
The container terminal at Tivoli docks is operated by the Port of Cork
