= Irish Steel =

Irish steel producer (closed 2001)

Irish Steel Limited
- Irish Steel logo, as used in the 1960s and 1970s. The motto is Irish for "[There is] no strength without steel."
- Trade name: Irish Steel
- Native name: Cruach na hÉireann Teoranta
- Company type: Semi-state company
- Industry: Steel production
- Founded: 1939; 87 years ago
- Defunct: 2001; 25 years ago
- Successor: Irish Ispat
- Headquarters: Haulbowline, Cork Harbour, Ireland
- Products: Sheet steel; Tinplate
- Owners: Private owner (1939–47); Irish government (1947–96); Ispat International (1996–2001)
- Number of employees: 450 (2001)

Irish Steel Limited (Irish: Cruach na hÉireann Teoranta), later known as Irish Ispat Limited, was an Irish semi-state company which was involved in steel production primarily from a plant on Haulbowline island in Cork Harbour. Originally founded in 1939, the company and its assets were sold to Ispat International (later known as Mittal Steel Company) (for IR£1) in 1996. The company and its plant closed down in 2001.

Dumping of production materials, including toxic waste, resulted in significant contamination of the Irish Steel plant site, and increased the size of Haulbowline island by 9 hectares (22 acres). Campaigners, including Erin Brockovich, pushed for action by the state, and €61m was allocated to clean-up the site and to redevelop it as a park. The cleanup and redevelopment project lasted upwards of a decade; from 2011 to 2021.

== History ==
Irish Steel was originally formed as a privately owned firm in 1939, and commenced operations from a steel plant on Haulbowline island, near Cobh in Cork Harbour. This company went into receivership in the 1940s, and in 1947 the then Minister for Industry and Commerce, Seán Lemass, established a state-financed company to acquire its assets and "secure 240 jobs".

In 1960, the state's involvement was expanded by the Irish Steel Holdings Limited Act 1960, in what Jack Lynch (by then Minister for Industry and Commerce) described as addressing a "gap which would otherwise exist in [Ireland's] industrial capacity". By the late 1960s, Irish Steel was producing approximately one-third of steel used by Irish industry. At its peak, in 1971, the company employed approximately 1,200 people and had increased production to run 24-hours-a-day, seven-days-a-week. In 1981, responsibility for Irish Steel was transferred from the Minister for Industry and Commerce to the Minister for Energy.

In 1972, Edward A. Coleman (the general manager of Irish Steel and a member of a delegation from the Confederation of Irish Industry travelling for discussions with EEC officials in Brussels), was among those killed in the Staines air disaster.

Irish Steel advert (on the back of a matchday programme from the 1991 Rugby World Cup finals) highlighting the company's association with Haulbowline

A fall in steel prices in Europe during the 1980s led to layoffs at Irish Steel, and the work-force was progressively reduced from 650. The assets of the company were sold to Irish Ispat (a subsidiary of Ispat International), for IR£1, in 1996. Under the terms of the sale agreement, the Haulbowline plant was operated under the condition that "£30 million would be invested in the plant and its 330 jobs would be secured" for at least five years. Shortly after this term ended in 2001, the plant was closed and 450 jobs were lost.

== Controversy ==
=== Safety ===
According to a 2005 article in The Irish Times, "Irish Ispat's tenure at Haulbowline was marked by controversy, with the firm failing to invest" as expected under the negotiated takeover agreement. There were several worker deaths between 1999 and 2001, including that of a lab technician who died in a fire. According to an inquest hearing, the plant's administrative block had no sprinklers, fire escapes or fire alarms, and that the "company's fire engine failed to start because of a flat battery". According to other reports, the plant's safety manager had been refused budget for improved fire-safety training.

=== Closure ===
The plant was closed, with limited notice, by Ispat International in 2001. At the time of closure, the company had debts of more than €57m. Reports of land and asset sales, prior to closure, led to some accusations of "asset-stripping" by the parent company. One such asset disposal, in the months prior to closure, involved the sale of a 30-acre site (for an undisclosed sum) to build a hazardous waste incinerator to the "fury of local residents". As of 2002, creditors were still owed over €20m, including over €7m due to former-workers for statutory redundancy and other payments.

=== Environmental impact ===
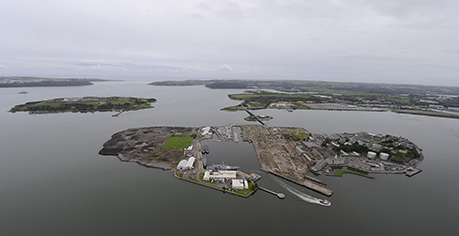
Haulbowline island in 2014, with the Irish Steel "East Tip" site (left) subject to clearance and redevelopment

From at least the 1960s, waste materials (including toxic chemicals and steel slag) used in the steel production process were dumped by Irish Steel on the eastern part of Haulbowline island. This dumping site became known as the "East Tip", and was described in later reports as one of Ireland's "worst polluted former industrial sites".

The "East Tip" expanded over several decades to include 650,000 cubic metres of waste, extending eastwards from Haulbowline's naval dockyard. The processing waste acted as approximately 22 acres (9 ha) of land reclamation infill, and the dumped materials reputedly increased Haulbowline island from approximately 60 acres (24 ha) to over 80 acres (32 ha) in size. According to the terms of planning permission, received by Irish Steel in 1981, there were no controls placed on the material that could be dumped or on protections required to prevent leachate into the harbour. By the time of the plant's closure in 2001, radioactive and Chromium 6 contamination was found to have remained in the island's soil. Campaigners, including Erin Brockovich, requested government action on the contamination issue.

As of 2011, it was reported that the contamination at the site had cost the state "more than €50 million — mostly in legal costs". As of 2014, €52 million had been spent on clearing the site, with "a further €40 million [earmarked] to make the site safe". While the Environmental Protection Agency had attributed €15.9m of the projected site cleanup costs to Irish Ispat (formerly Irish Steel), the High Court dismissed a claim by the state to have the company's liquidator cover the cost of making the site environmentally safe. The Irish government was later threatened with legal action by the European Commission, for a failure to meet its obligations under the Waste Framework Directive. In 2016, it was reported that the remediation works budget, of €61m, would not be sufficient to complete the full cleanup and redevelopment project.

The cleanup and redevelopment of the former Irish Steel "East Tip" site took more than a decade to complete, between 2011 (when the work necessary to prepare a waste licence application was discussed) and 2021 (when the site was opened as a park). Haulbowline Island Amenity Park was officially opened in January 2021.
