= Haulbowline =

Island in Cork Harbour, Ireland

Haulbowline Island
Native name: Inis Sionnach
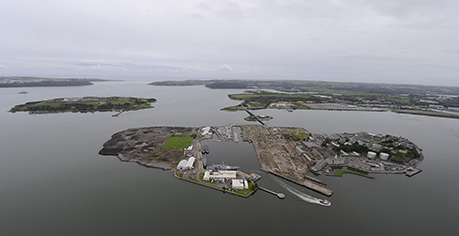
- Aerial view with Naval Base to west (right), former industrial site to east (left) & dockyard (centre)

- Location within island of Ireland

Geography
- Location: County Cork, Ireland
- Coordinates: 51°50.5′N 8°18′W
- Area: 35 ha (86 acres)

Administration
- Ireland
- Province: Munster
- County: Cork
- Water body: Cork Harbour

Demographics
- Population: 148 (2022)

Haulbowline (Irish: Inis Sionnach; Old Norse: Ál-boling) is an island in Cork Harbour off the coast of Ireland. The world's first yacht club was founded on Haulbowline in 1720. The western side of the island is the main naval base and headquarters for the Irish Naval Service, with the eastern side previously used for heavy industry and later redeveloped as a park.

Since 1966, the island has been connected to the mainland by a roadbridge.

== Etymology ==
The Irish language name for the island, Inis Sionnach, translates to "island of the foxes".

The island's English name may derive from Old Norse ál-boling meaning "eel dwelling" or "area where there are eels". In the 17th and 18th-century, spellings ended in "-ing". There may have been a nautical influence on the modern spelling, from the sailing terms "haul" and "bowline".

== Demographics ==
Historical population

Year	Pop.	±%
1841	222	—
1851	252	+13.5%
1861	525	+108.3%
1871	379	−27.8%
1881	447	+17.9%
1891	401	−10.3%
1901	559	+39.4%
1911	431	−22.9%
1926	430	−0.2%

Year	Pop.	±%
1936	190	−55.8%
1946	372	+95.8%
1951	275	−26.1%
1956	256	−6.9%
1961	284	+10.9%
1966	262	−7.7%
1971	306	+16.8%
1979	325	+6.2%
1981	452	+39.1%

Year	Pop.	±%
1986	466	+3.1%
1991	307	−34.1%
1996	110	−64.2%
2002	75	−31.8%
2006	165	+120.0%
2011	148	−10.3%
2016	216	+45.9%
2022	148	−31.5%

Source: "CNA17: Population by Off Shore Island, Sex and Year". CSO.ie. Central Statistics Office.

== Naval history ==
=== Royal Navy ===
At a strategic and deepwater position in the harbour, the island has long been a military base. The island was first fortified in 1602, and was initially an important base for the British Army. In 1603 the Cork city fathers were accused of attempting to demolish it, and William Meade, the Recorder of Cork, was charged with treason as a result.

In 1720, much of the island was owned by the Cork Water Club, later connected to the Royal Cork Yacht Club (claimed as the world's first yacht club). There was a castle on the island which was the clubhouse for the Cork Water Club.

In 1806, the British Army moved to nearby Spike Island, and the fortifications were handed over, with 14 acres (6 ha) of land going to the Royal Navy, and the remaining 8 acres (3 ha) to the Board of Ordnance. (At the time the island was less than half its present size.)

An Ordnance Yard was established on the westernmost part of the island, separated from the rest by a large stone wall. A Martello tower was built for defence, and in 1808 a pair of magazines were erected on nearby Rocky Island with capacity for 25,000 barrels of gunpowder. East of the wall a Victualling Yard was laid out, and from 1807 to 1824 a series of buildings were constructed, several of which are still standing. Most prominent are six large Storehouses, three grouped together around a quay on the north side of the island, and three along what was then its eastern edge. Behind these was a large rectangular rainwater tank (which collected fresh water for the ships), on top of which was a quadrangular cooperage complex. To the south were a mast and boat store, at the top of a slipway, and to the west, along the length of the wall, were cottages and houses for the workers and officers of the yard. At this time, some 4 acres (2 ha) was added to the island through land reclamation, the first of several such additions.

Quite soon after so much investment, the Navy announced the closure of the Yard in 1831; ten years later, though, it reopened. The next major development came in the 1860s with the establishment of a Royal Navy Dockyard on Haulbowline, for warship repair and construction. To accommodate this new industrial complex the island was doubled in size to a total of around 60 acres (24 ha). The large basin was constructed, which today bisects the island, with a 408 ft (124 m) dry dock at one end (extended to 600 ft (180 m) just prior to the First World War). By the 20th century, the (now renamed) Royal Alexandra Victualling Yard area also contained a coaling/fuelling depot, as well as a naval hospital (housed in one of the Storehouses).

=== Irish Naval Service ===
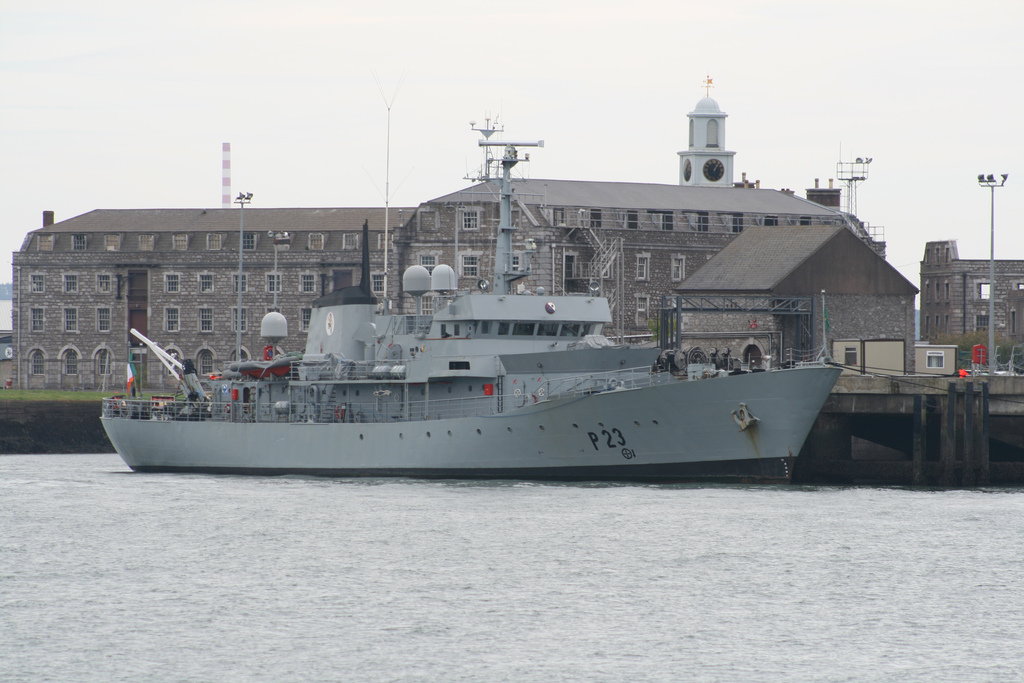
LÉ Aisling (P23) alongside the former Victualling Storehouses of 1807-24

Unlike the other fortifications in Cork Harbour, which formed part of the treaty ports, the dockyard was handed over to the Irish Free State in March 1923, and remains the main naval base and headquarters for the Irish Naval Service.

In June 1940, an Irish Marine and Coastwatching Service Motor Torpedo Boat (MTB) returned to Haulbowline after making two trips to rescue French and British soldiers during the Dunkirk evacuation.

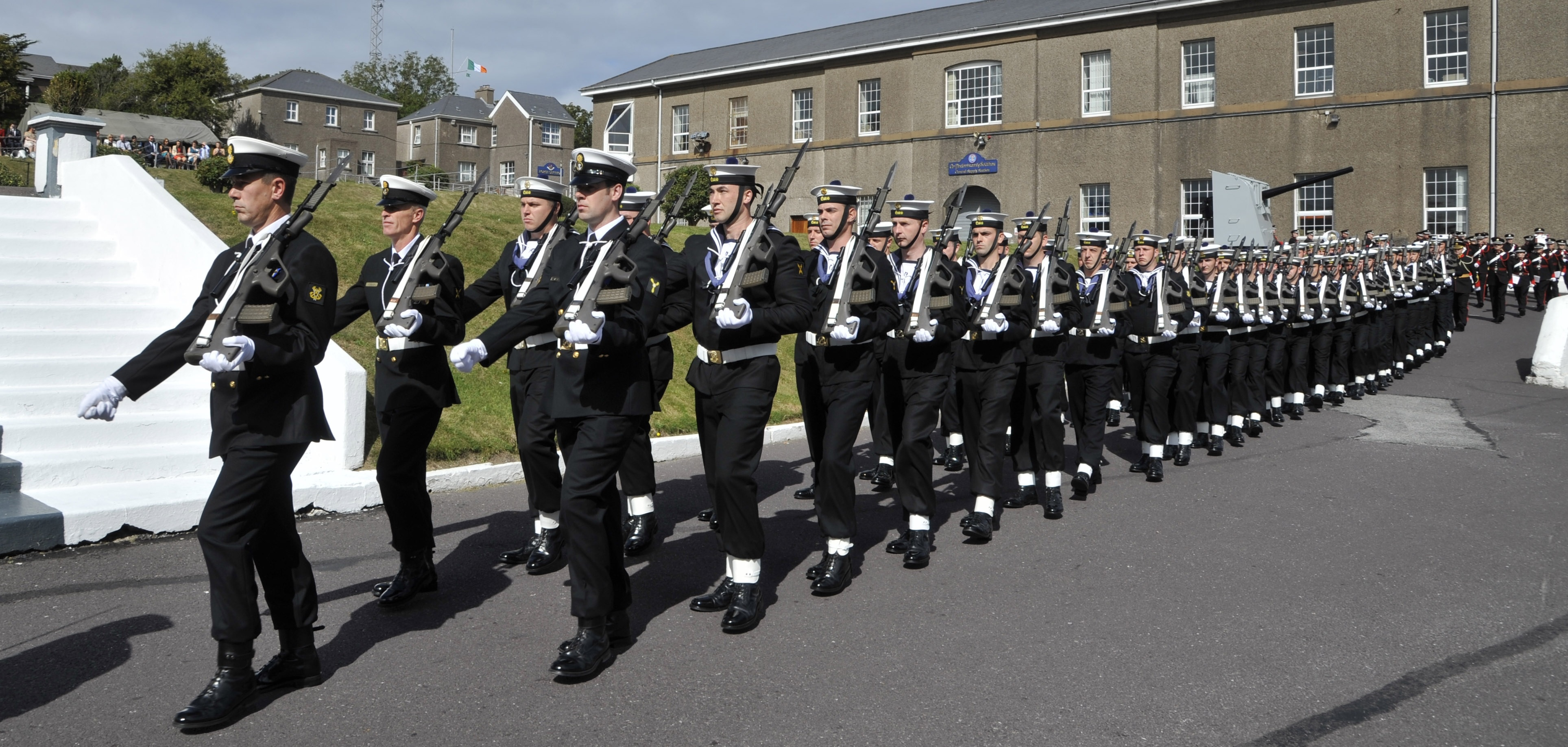
Irish Navy recruits, passing out parade at Haulbowline (quadrangle of the former Ordnance Yard)

The majority of the Naval Service campus is on the west of the Island – much of it within the former Ordnance Yard – save for the service's football pitch which was reclaimed from land on the eastern side in the 1980s. In September 2014, the Minister for Defence Simon Coveney announced plans for a €50m upgrade of the naval base with improved quays to cater for the Naval Service's new ships and the construction of a runway to enable the Naval Service to operate UAV drones.

In March 2008, one of the historic 19th century industrial storehouses on Haulbowline Island was destroyed by fire, leaving only its walls still standing.

== Industry and development ==
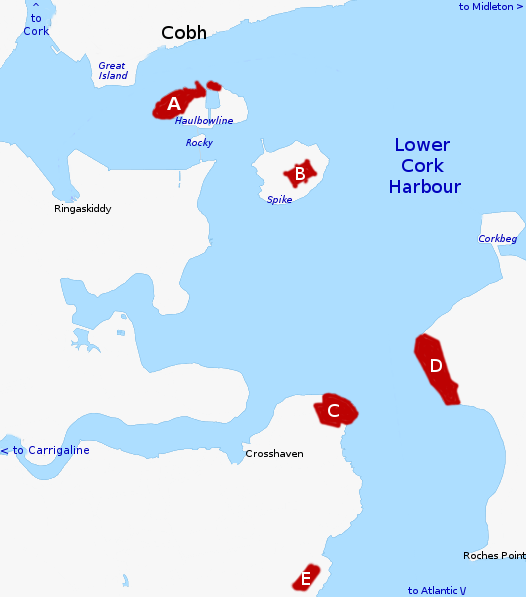
Plan of lower harbour showing Naval Base relative to other installations: (A) Haulbowline Naval Base, (B) Fort Mitchel/Westmoreland, (C) Fort Meagher/Camden, (D) Fort Davis/Carlisle, (E) Fort Templebreedy

=== Irish Steel site ===
Irish Steel (later known as Irish Ispat) was based on the east of the island, on the site formerly occupied by the 1869 Dockyard, between 1939 and 2001. During this time, waste products from the steel making process were dumped or stored on the site, and radioactive and Chromium 6 contamination remained in the soil after the plant closed. The contamination from this period of industrial use has been cited as a potential impact to the future development of the island, and campaigners, including Erin Brockovich, had requested government action on the contamination issue. The island's 'East Tip' was made up of slag and other waste material from the plant; it added a further 22 acres (9 ha) to the size of Haulbowline Island, increasing it from approximately 60 acres (24 ha) to over 80 acres (32 ha) in size.

In July 2006, it was announced that the former steel plant site would be developed with apartments, offices, a hotel and a marina. However, this plan was shelved when the celtic tiger came to an end in 2008.

=== Park ===
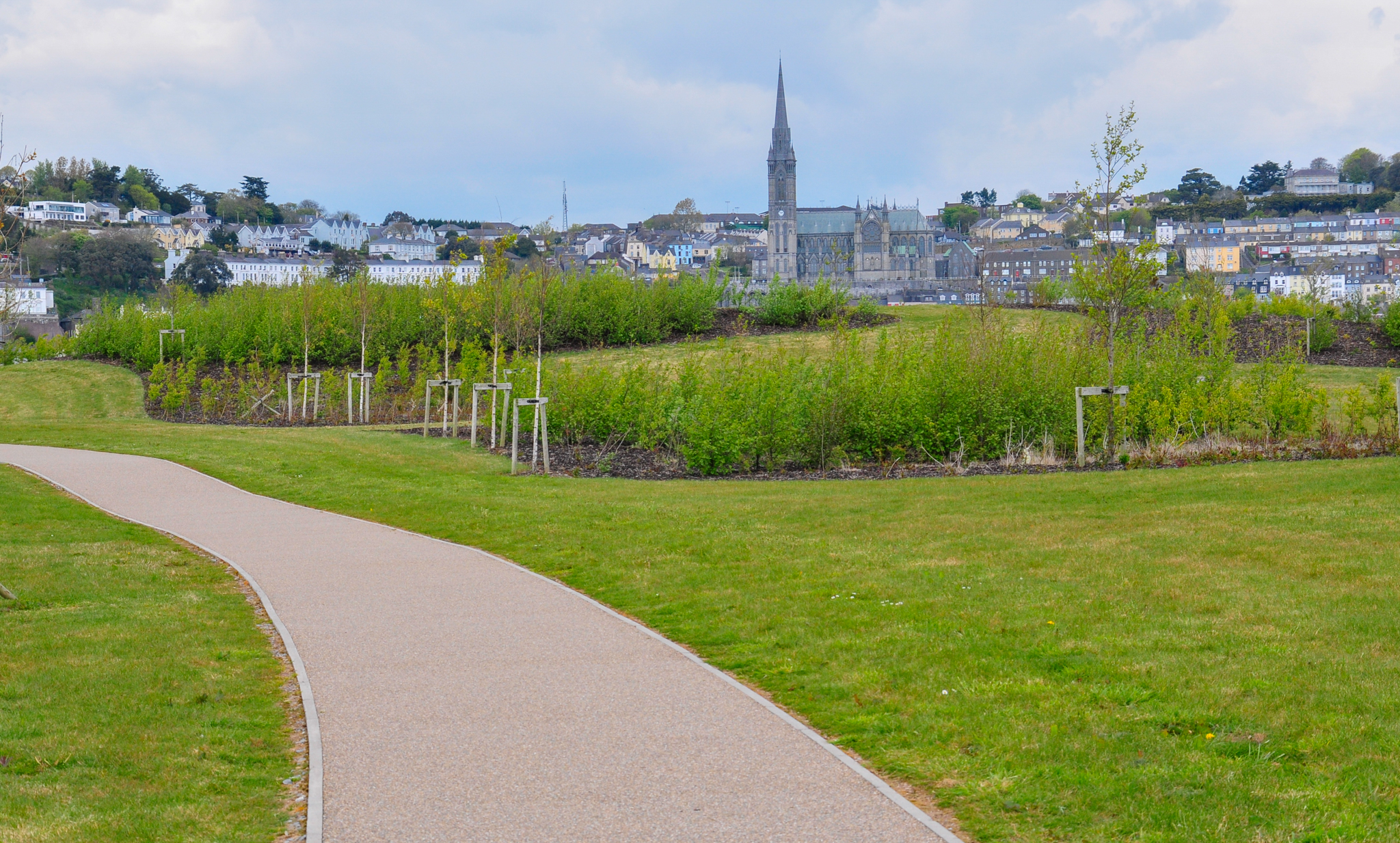
Planting in Haulbowline Island Amenity Park

In 2014, plans were publicised by the Department of Agriculture and the Marine which anticipated the upgrading of the island's road bridge, to facilitate the clean-up of the former Irish Steel site for redevelopment as a park. Originally estimated at €40m, the cost of the clean-up and redevelopment was later updated to at least €61m, and (as of late 2016) queried for its suitability. While some of the clean-up and park development works were completed before the end of 2018, some reports questioned the potential public health risks arising from residual contaminants on what was "one of the country's worst polluted former industrial sites".

Following the cleanup and park developments, it was intended that the Department of Agriculture and the Marine and Department of Defence would transfer the parkland to Cork County Council in May 2019. This transfer, however, was deferred following "a delay in preparing the lease for the site". The park, officially known as Haulbowline Island Amenity Park, was opened to the public in January 2021.

== See also ==
- List of Irish military installations
