= Port of Cork =

Port covering Cork Harbour in Ireland

- Interactive map of Port of Cork
- Location within Ireland

Location
- Country: Ireland
- Location: Cork City
- Coordinates: 51.85°N 8.27°W
- UN/LOCODE: IEORK

Details
- Opened: Medieval era
- Owned by: Port of Cork Company Ltd.
- Type of Harbor: Deepwater; Multi-model; Panamax; Warm-water
- No. of berths: 5
- Employees: 164 (2021)
- Chief Executive: Eoin McGettigan

Statistics
- Annual cargo tonnage: 10.6 million
- Annual container volume: 281,816
- Website portofcork.ie

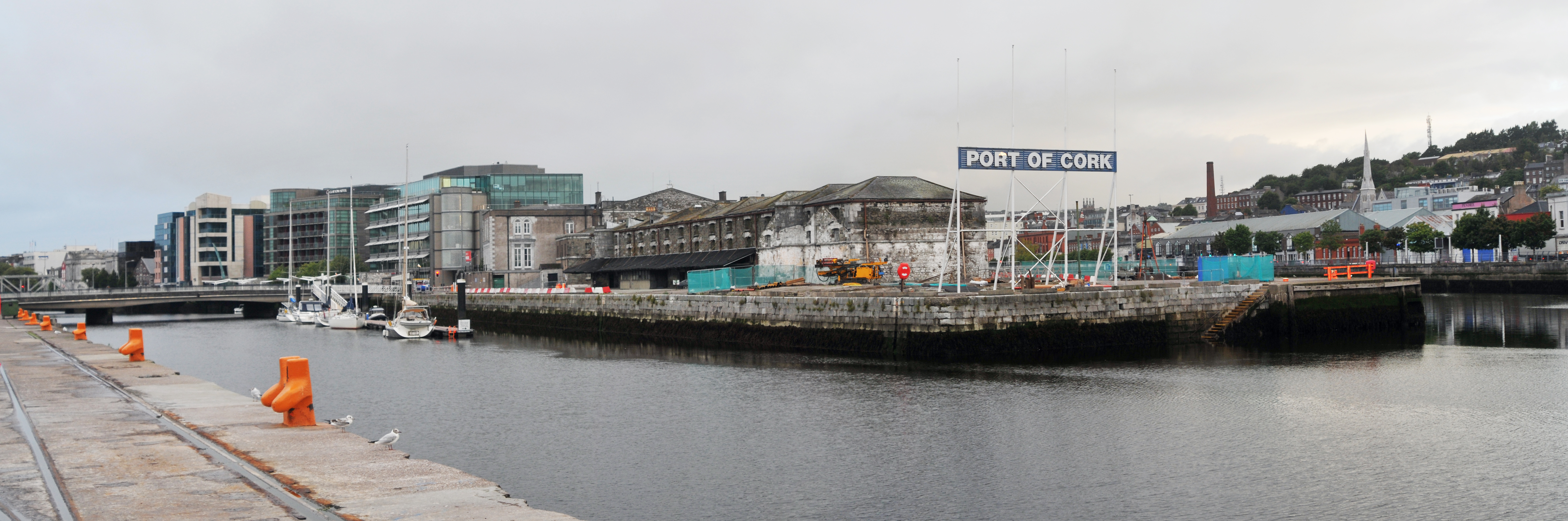
Port of Cork (City section)

The Port of Cork (Irish: Port Chorcaí) is the main port serving the south of Ireland, County Cork and Cork City. It is one of the three "Ports of National Significance (Tier 1)" as designated by National Ports Policy.

It offers all six shipping modes (i.e. Lift-on Lift-off, Roll-on Roll-off, Liquid Bulk, Dry Bulk, Break Bulk and Cruise). In 2015, over 11 million tonnes of freight were shipped through the Port of Cork, making it the state's second busiest port. As well as its berths upriver at Cork City, the port also includes other major locations across Cork Harbour, including Tivoli loading docks in the eastern suburbs, Cobh on the south of Great Island and Ringaskiddy on the west side of the harbour.

== History ==
Historically, the navigation and port facilities of the city and harbour were managed by the Cork Harbour Commissioners. Founded in 1814, the Cork Harbour Commissioners moved to the Custom House in 1904. Following the implementation of the 1996 Harbours Act, by March 1997 all assets of the Commissioners were transferred to the Port of Cork Company. This statutory body is responsible for the management, control, operation and development of the Port of Cork and the harbour. In February 2021, the company sold and vacated the Custom House building.

== Operations ==
The Port of Cork company is a commercial semi-state company with responsibility for the commercial running of the harbour, as well as for navigation and berthage in the port. In 2011, the company had a turnover of €21.4 million and made pre-tax profits of €1.2 million. This was down from a turnover of €26.4 million and profits of €5.4 million in 2006. Container traffic increased by 6% in 2011 when 156,667 teus were handled at the Tivoli container facility, however this was down from a peak of 185,000 teus in 2006. The 2006 figure saw the port at full capacity and the company drew up plans for a new container facility capable of handling up to 400,000 teus per annum at Ringaskiddy, which was the subject of major objections. Following a public Oral Planning Hearing in 2008, the Irish planning board An Bord Pleanála rejected the plan due to inadequate rail and road links at the location. There has been an increase in cruise ship visits to Cork Harbour in the early 21st century, with 53 such ships visiting the port in 2011, increasing to approximately 100 cruise ship visits by 2019. These cruise ships berth at the Port of Cork's deep-water quay in Cobh, which is Ireland's only dedicated berth for cruise ships.

In 2021, The Port of Cork reportedly had an operating profit of €7.8 million (€6.1m in 2020).

== Traffic ==
Vessels up to 90,000 tonnes deadweight (DWT) are capable of coming through entrance to Cork Harbour. As the shipping channels get shallower the farther inland one travels, access becomes constricted, and only vessels up to 60,000 DWT can sail above Cobh.

The Port of Cork provides pilotage and towage facilities for vessels entering Cork Harbour. All vessels accessing the quays in Cork City must be piloted and all vessels exceeding 130 metres in length must be piloted once they pass within 2.5 nautical miles (4.6 km) of the harbour entrance.

In 2021, the ports of Cork and Bantry reported a total consolidated traffic of 10.6 million tonnes, largely in line with the equivalent figures from 2020. Due to the retention of existing traffic and the commencement of a number of new direct services to Europe from Ringaskiddy (following Brexit), 2021 also saw a year-on-year increase in the number of container twenty-foot equivalent units or TEUs (from 250,209 TEUs in 2020 to 281,816 in 2021).

== Facilities ==
Cork Harbour map showing Port of Cork locations at Cork, Tivoli, Ringaskiddy and Cobh

The Port of Cork has berthing facilities at Cork City, Tivoli, Ringaskiddy, and Cobh.

Cork City's quays are primarily used for grain and oil transport. The city quays house 10 berths, mostly privately owned.

Tivoli's infrastructure includes container handling facilities, as well as provisions for oil, ore, livestock, and a roll-on-roll-off (Ro-Ro) ramp. Before the Ringaskiddy Ferry Port opened, car ferries also operated from Tivoli. Today, the Ro-Ro ramp at Tivoli is primarily used by companies importing cars into Ireland.

Ringaskiddy is home to a passenger and car ferry terminal, and operates as a deep water port.

In 2022, the Port of Cork Company opened a €89 million container terminal in Ringaskiddy. According to the Irish Times, this represented the "largest single investment by any port in Ireland over the past 100 years".

Cobh's quays are used as a terminal for cruise ships - the only such dedicated cruise terminal in the Republic of Ireland.

There are a number of other private berths elsewhere around the harbour. These are usually associated with a particular industry. These specialised berths are in Whitegate (oil jetties), Passage West (grain), Rushbrooke (cargo), Ringaskiddy (car ferry) and Haulbowline (naval/military).

== Passenger ferries ==
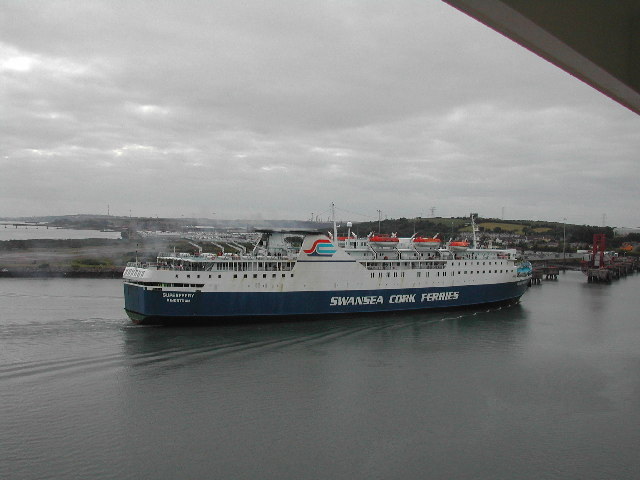
Car ferry at Ringaskiddy

Operating since the late 1970s, Brittany Ferries runs a ferry service to Roscoff in France. This operates between April and November from the Ro Ro facilities at Ringaskiddy. From June 2026, Hibernia Line is due to run services to Boulogne-sur-Mer.

Previous ferry services ran to Swansea in Wales and Santander in Spain. The former, the Swansea Cork ferry, ran initially between 1987 and 2006 and also briefly between 2010 and 2012. The latter, a Brittany Ferries Cork–Santander service, started in 2018 but was cancelled in early 2020.

In April 2022, the Port of Cork company entered into a three-year agreement, with Brittany Ferries, for a second weekly sailing between Cork and Roscoff.

== Gallery ==
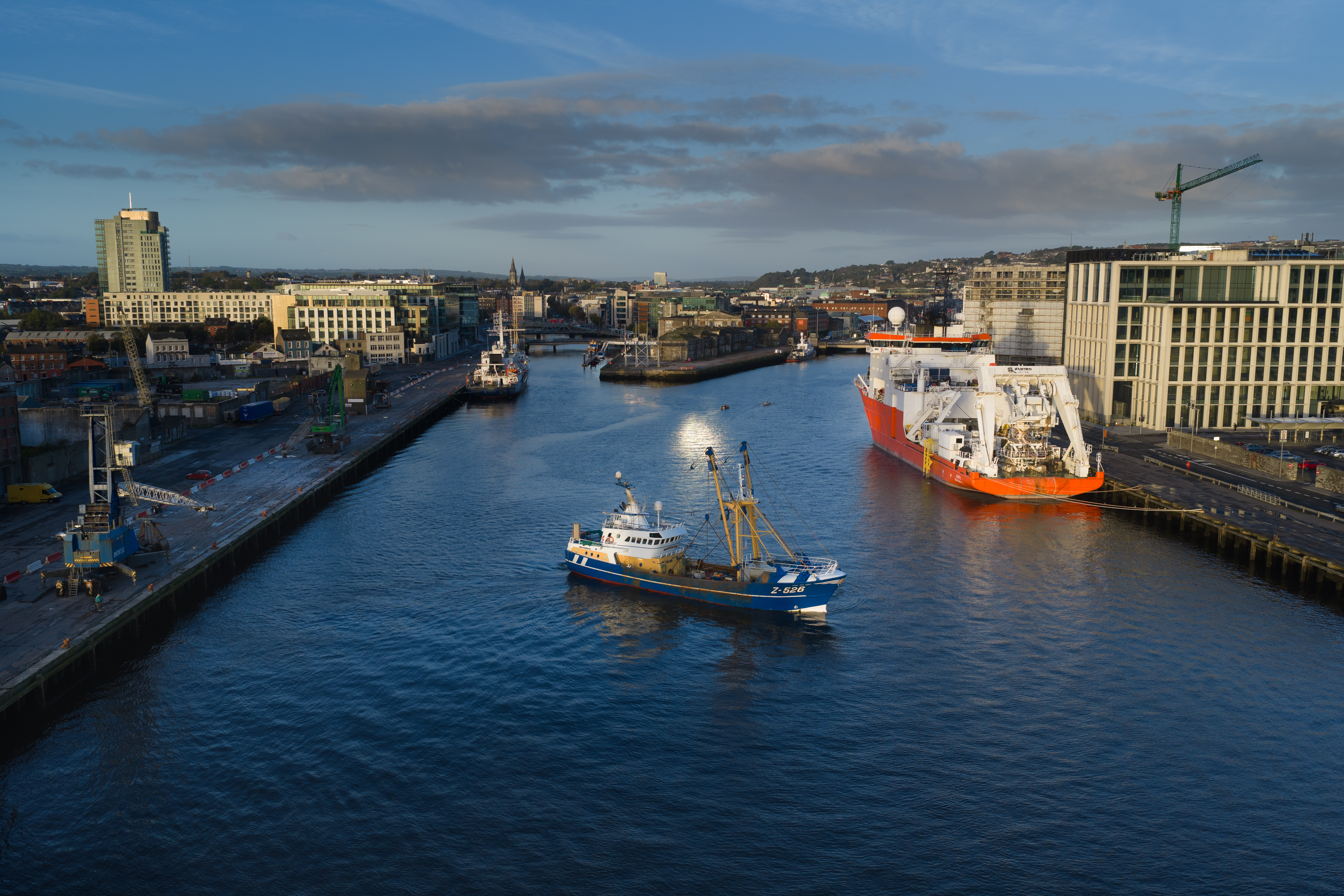
View from the east looking upriver into the city

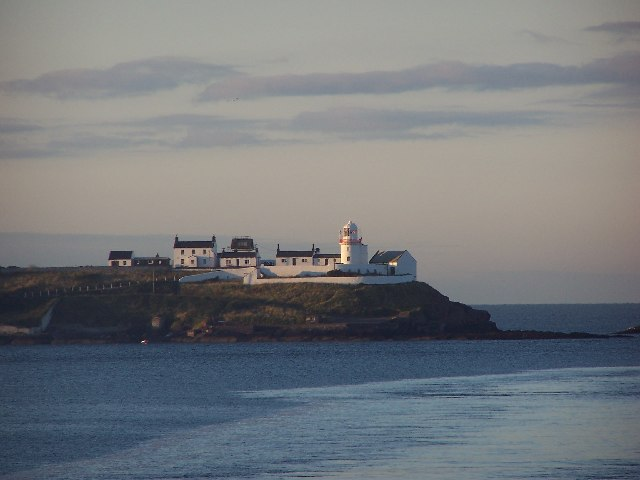
Mouth of Cork Harbour

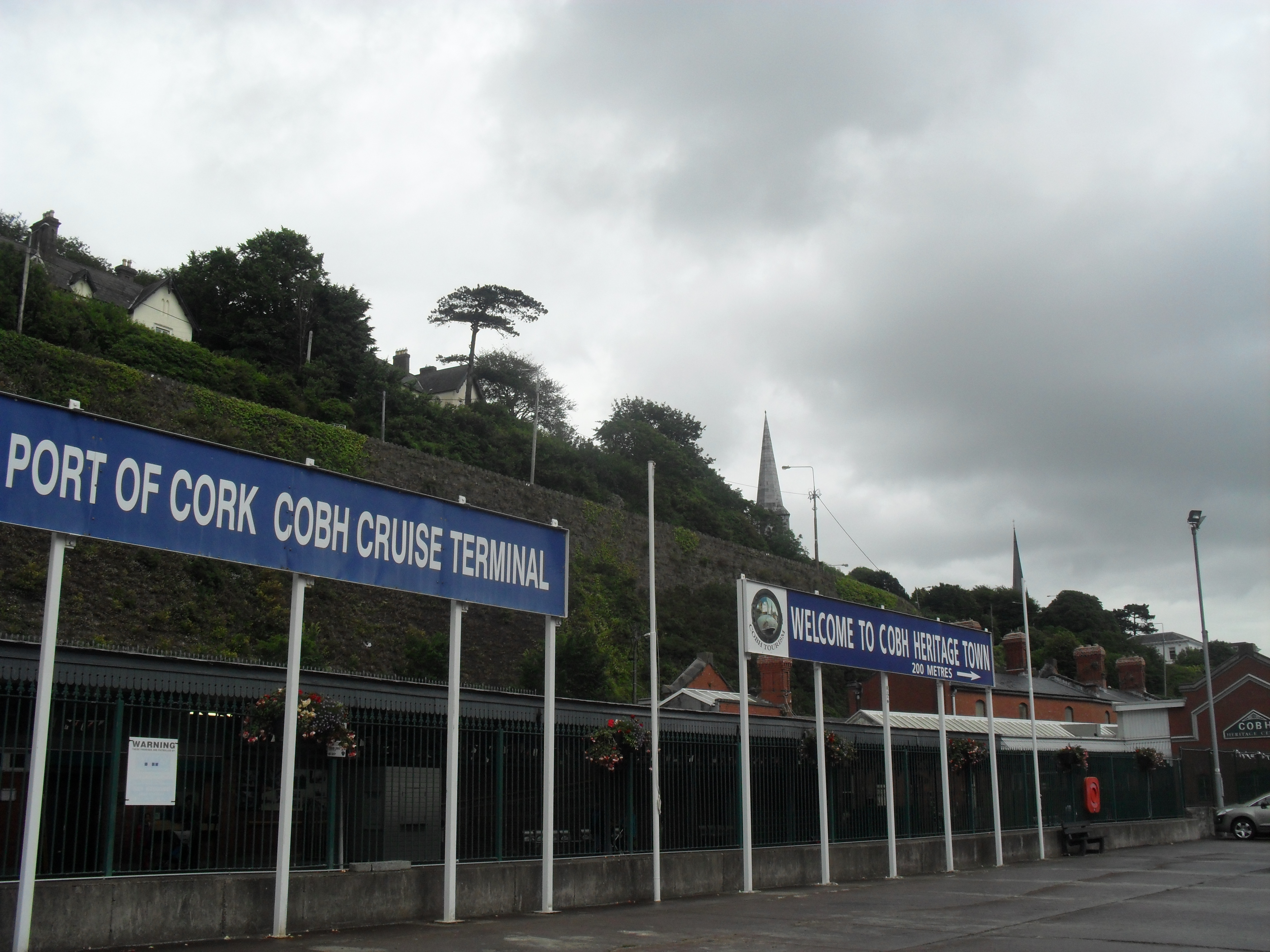
Cruise terminal at Cobh

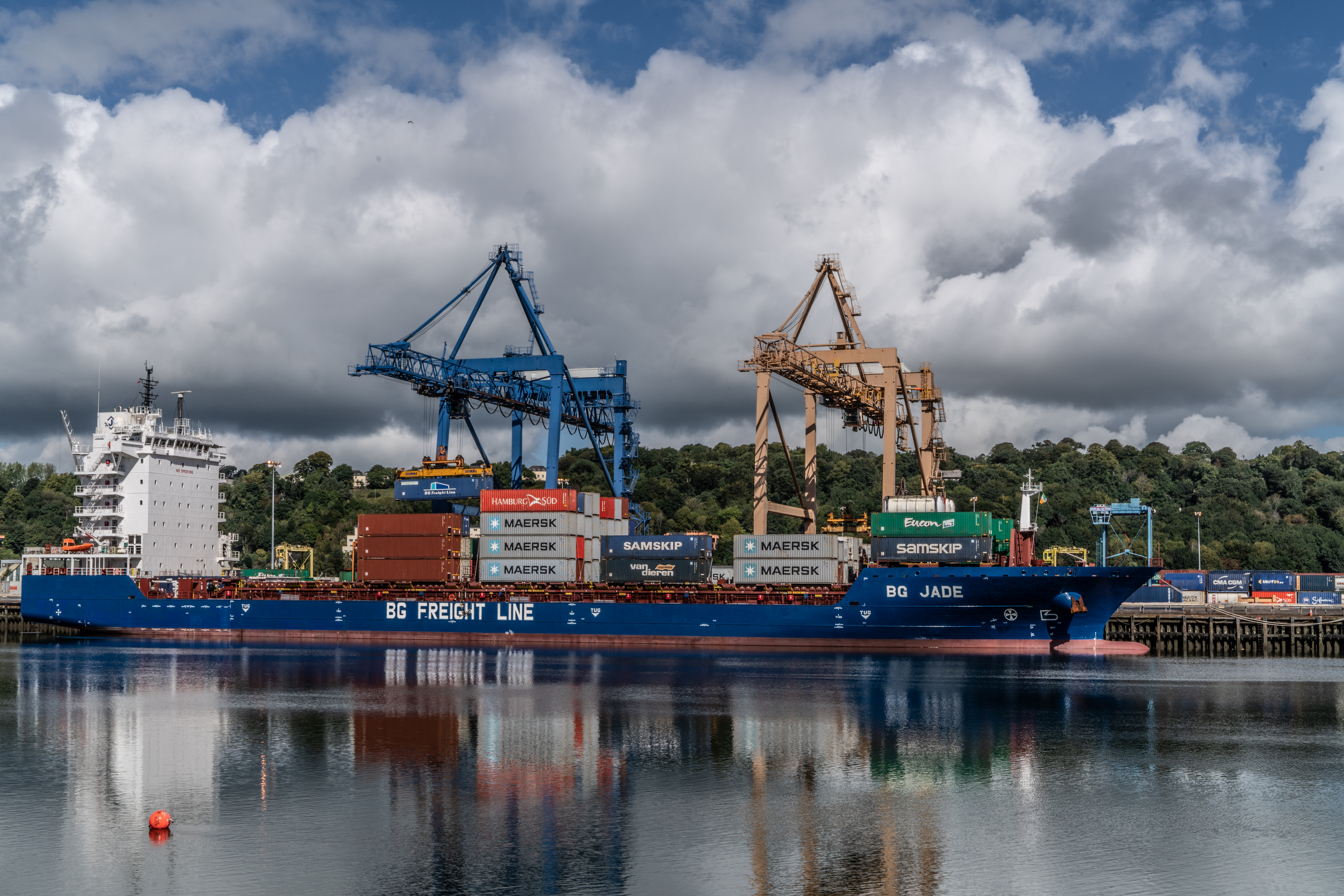
Container ship at Tivoli

== See also ==
- List of deepest natural harbours
