= N28 road (Ireland) =

Road in Ireland

N28 road
- Bóthar N28

Route information
- Length: 11.25 km (6.99 mi)

Location
- Country: Ireland
- Primary destinations: Cork City; South Ring Road (N40); Douglas (R609); County Cork; Carrigaline (R611); Shanbally; Ringaskiddy

Highway system
- Roads in Ireland; Motorways; Primary; Secondary; Regional

The N28 road is a national primary road in Ireland. It connects the port and village of Ringaskiddy to the N40 South Ring Road in Cork city.

The road begins at the Bloomfield Interchange on the N40 South Ring Road in Rochestown. It runs southwards as Carr's Hill towards Carrigaline, leaving Cork at the L6477 junction, where it becomes Cork Road. North of Carrigaline, the route passes through the Shannonpark Roundabout and proceeds east through the village of Shanbally to Ringaskiddy.

Prior to the completion of the South Ring, the N28 formed the route from the Bandon Road interchange through the Kinsale Road interchange to where it leaves the N40.

== Future Plans ==
As of 2021, 11 km of motorway was planned on the N28 between Cork and Ringaskiddy, with a final 1.5 km of single carriageway. Following the conclusion of a court challenge, the project was cleared to begin construction in 2021. In October 2021, "main works" were expected to commence in 2024. Cabinet approval was expected in April 2025.

== Proposed M28 Junctions ==
The following information is proposed and may not be the outcome. Many of the proposed exits are only able to be joined from southbound, but this could change after completion. The regional road that will replace the existing N28 is still not known.

M28
Southbound exits (read down)	Junction	Northbound exits (read up)
Start of motorway		South Ring Road (N40)
Douglas, Rochestown, Passage West (R610)		No exit
Douglas (R609), Maryborough Hill (L2470)		Douglas, Rochestown (R609), Maryborough Hill (L2470)
Carrigaline (R611), Kinsale via (R600), Crosshaven via (R612)		No exit
Shanbally		No exit
Ringaskiddy, Currabinny (R613)		Start of motorway

== See also ==
- Roads in Ireland
- Motorways in Ireland
- National secondary road
- Regional road
