= R610 road (Ireland) =

Road in Ireland

Coordinates: 51.875115°N 8.342439°W

R610 road
- Bóthar R610
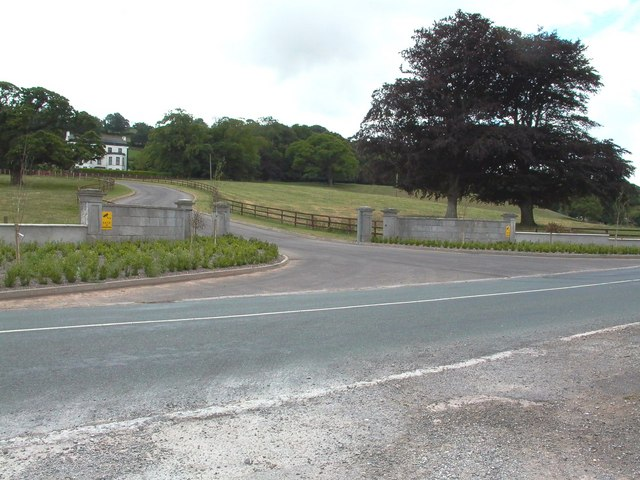
- R610 near the city and county boundary in Passage West

Route information
- Length: 11.8 km (7.3 mi)

Major junctions
- From: N8 Cork (Merchant's Quay)
- Crosses River Lee; N27 Cork (South Link Road); R853 Cork (Well Road); Passes under N40; R609 Cork (Fingerpost Roundabout); N28 Cork (Rochestown Road); Passes through Passage West, Glenbrook and Monkstown
- To: N28 Raffeen

Location
- Country: Ireland
- Primary destinations: Cork City; City Centre; Douglas; Passes under N28; Rochestown; County Cork; Passage West; Glenbrook; Monkstown; Raffeen

Highway system
- Roads in Ireland; Motorways; Primary; Secondary; Regional

The R610 road is a regional road in Ireland, located in County Cork and Cork City, beginning at a junction with the N28 and terminating on Parnell Place and Grand Parade in the city centre (N8 and N22 junctions respectively). The road connects Monkstown, Passage West and Glenbrook in County Cork with Rochestown, Douglas and the city centre in Cork City.
