= Kinsale Road Roundabout =

- Magic Roundabout

Location
- Cork City, Ireland
- Coordinates: 51°52′24.9″N 8°28′12.15″W
- Roads at junction: N27; N40; L2548

Construction
- Opened: 1990
- Reconstructed: 2006 (flyover)

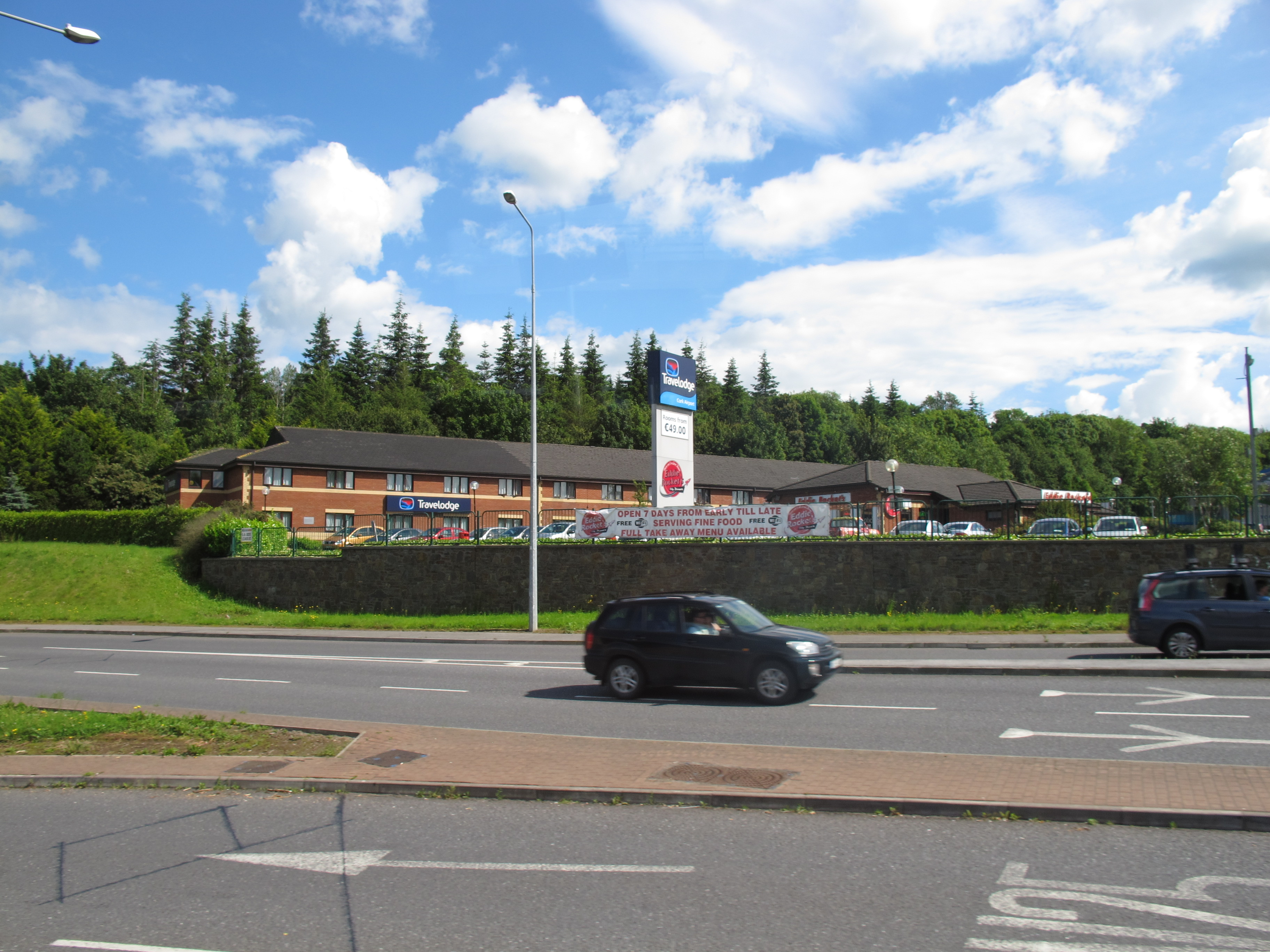
There is a budget Travelodge hotel just off the Kinsale Road Roundabout

The Kinsale Road Roundabout (Irish: Timpeallán Bhóthar Chionn tSáile) is a five-arm signalised roundabout in Cork City in Ireland, located approximately 3km south of the city centre at the junction of the N40 South Ring Road and the N27 South City Link/Airport Road.

The South Ring Road was constructed on a phased basis from the late 1980s, with the Kinsale Road Roundabout opening in 1990. With the completion of the downstream crossing of the River Lee, the Jack Lynch Tunnel, there was a marked increase in traffic using the N40, which in turn led to increased delays at the Kinsale Road Roundabout. A flyover was therefore built over the roundabout in 2006.

== Developments ==
=== Flyover ===
As of 2006, traffic counts showed that there were approximately 100,000 vehicles using the roundabout daily. The straight-through movement between the east and west sides of the South Ring Road was the highest recorded traffic movement at the roundabout. As such, it was deemed that there was a need for grade separation. A number of options were evaluated in terms of environmental impact, safety, constructibility, cost, aesthetics, disruption to traffic during construction and land take. These included two flyover and two underpass options. Ultimately it was considered that a flyover carrying the N40 South Ring Road (east-west over the existing roundabout) was the most suitable solution. Construction on this flyover started in mid-2005 and finished in August 2006.

=== Nearby upgrades ===
The Bandon Road Roundabout and Sarsfield Road Roundabout are located a few kilometres to the west of the Kinsale Road Roundabout. Both roundabouts underwent grade separation works together owing to their proximity to each other. This resulted in a non-stop continuous dual-carriageway between the area west of Ballincollig to the Dunkettle Interchange near the north portal of the Jack Lynch Tunnel.
