= N40 road (Ireland) =

National primary road in Cork, Ireland

N40 road
- Bóthar N40
- South Ring Road
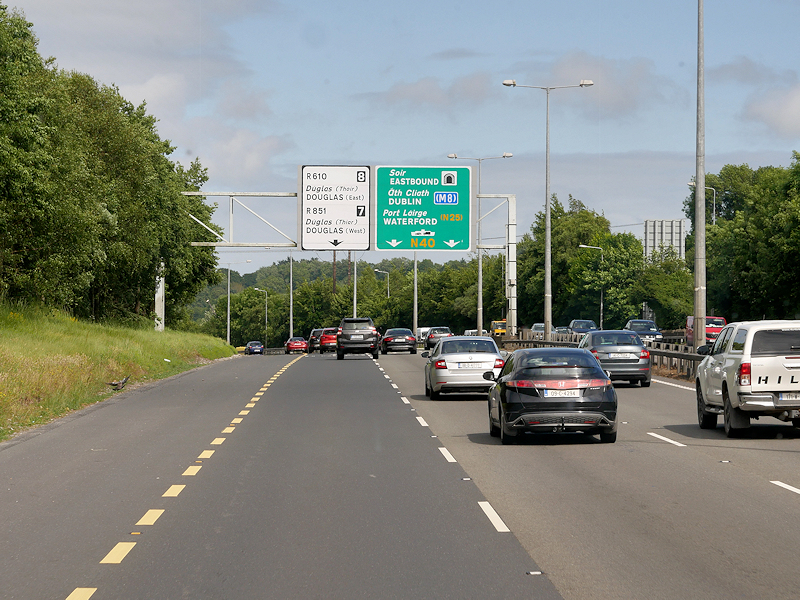

Route information
- Length: 15.45 km (9.60 mi)
- Existed: 1995–present
- History: J6 to J7: 1990; J7 to J9: 1992; J3 to J6: 1995; J9 to J11: 1999; J1 to J3: 2004; J6 flyover: 2006; J3 & J4 flyovers: 2013; J11 freeflow upgrade: 2016

Major junctions
- J1 → N22 J3 → N71 road J6 → N27 road J9 → N28 road J11 → M8 motorway, N8 road, N25 road

Location
- Country: Ireland
- Primary destinations: Cork City; Ballincollig (N22); Bishopstown (R849); Wilton (R641); Togher; City Centre (N27); Cork Airport (N27); Frankfield; Douglas (R851, R610); Rochestown (R610); Blackrock (R852); Mahon (R852); Dunkettle Interchange; County Cork; Bandon (N71); Carrigaline (N28); Ringaskiddy (N28)

Highway system
- Roads in Ireland; Motorways; Primary; Secondary; Regional

The N40 road (commonly known as the Cork South Ring Road, or locally the South Ring) is a national primary road in Cork, Ireland. It is partial ring road skirting the southern suburbs of the city, from the N22 west of Ballincollig, via the Jack Lynch Tunnel under the River Lee, to the Dunkettle Interchange where it meets the N25 and N8/M8. The present N40 designation was created on 23 February 2012 via statutory instrument by renaming parts of the N22 and N25. The N40 serves as both a commuter route and a bypass of the city centre for traffic between parts southwest and east. The National Transport Strategy envisages building a "Cork North Ring Road" to complete the circuit in the 2030s.

== Route ==
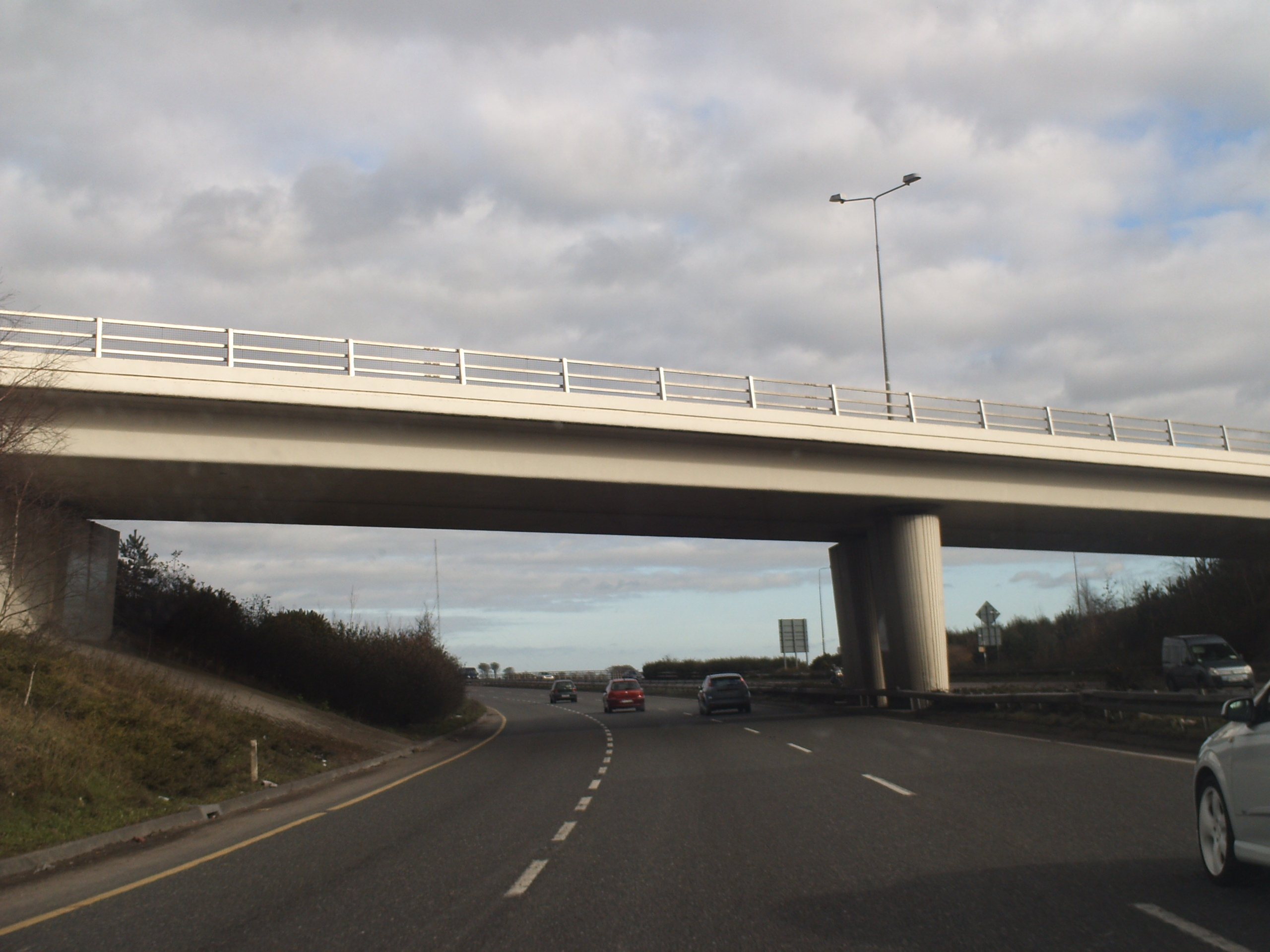
South Ring Road as it passes under the eastbound spur of the N28 Bloomfield Interchange

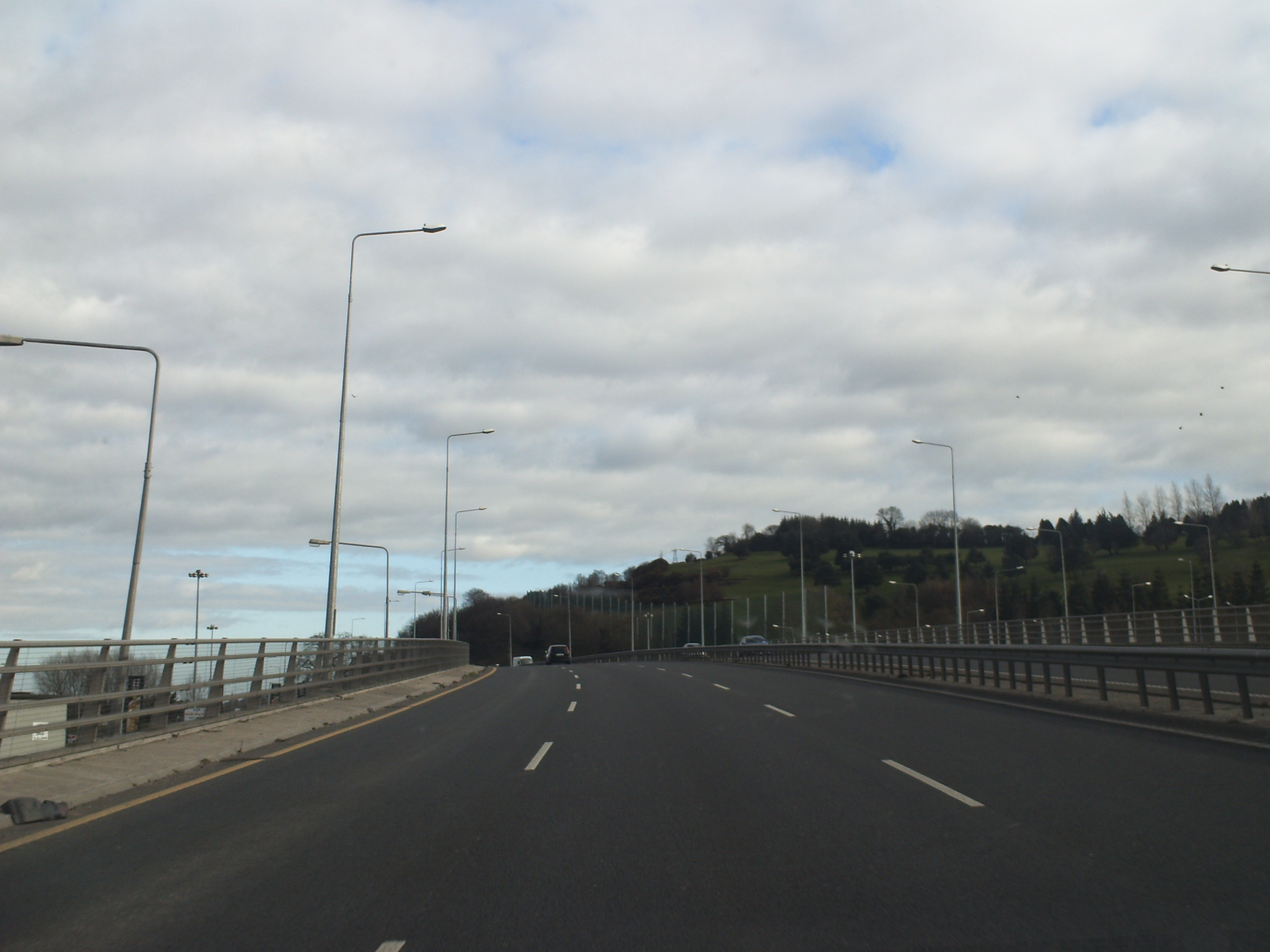
South Ring Road as it passes over Kinsale Road Roundabout, locally referred to as the "magic roundabout".

The South Ring Road commences at the junction with the N22 at the end of the Ballincollig bypass. The N40 next passes the Curraheen Interchange before meeting the Bandon Road Roundabout, which forms a junction with the N71. This junction also gives access to west Bishopstown. The next exit leads from the Sarsfield Roundabout up to the Wilton Roundabout after passing Wilton Shopping Centre on the left, Cork University Hospital and west Bishopstown.

From there, after passing the exit to Togher/Turner's Cross, it runs east over the Kinsale Road Roundabout by flyover. It also meets the N27 to Cork Airport, Kinsale Road and the N27 South Link Road to the city centre by exiting onto the Kinsale Road Roundabout by slip road.

The South Ring Road continues east, overpassing Douglas and meets the N28 to Ringaskiddy (Carr's Hill) at the Bloomfield Interchange. From here the road passes under the River Lee through the Jack Lynch Tunnel.

North of the tunnel, the South Ring Road ends at the Dunkettle Interchange with the M8 to Dublin, the N8 to the city centre, Limerick and Glanmire via the R639 and the N25 to Waterford via Midleton, Dungarvan and Youghal.

== Upgrades ==
=== Kinsale Road Roundabout ===
On 4 August 2006, a 2.5 km (1.6 mi) flyover of the Kinsale Road Roundabout was opened to traffic 6 months ahead of schedule. The project cost 55 million euro and consists of 3 lanes eastbound, 2 lanes west-bound and four on/off-ramps connecting the dual-carriageway to the roundabout.

=== Bandon Road Roundabout and Sarsfield Road Roundabout ===
On 12 March 2010, the NRA confirmed that both the Bandon Road Roundabout and the Sarsfield Road Roundabout would have flyovers built, with traffic travelling on the Cork South Ring Road being able to avoid both roundabouts when staying on the mainline. While minor work on this scheme had already commenced in 2008, full construction started on 6 July 2011 and was completed in July 2013. As well as two flyovers being built, the dual carriageway between both roundabouts will be upgraded and straightened with two access roads being built on either side for local access.

== Future plans ==
The latest of many plans to complete the ring road circuit is in the Cork Metropolitan Area Transport Strategy 2040 (CMATS), which envisages a "Cork North Ring Road" running north from Ballincollig to Monard and then east to the M8 near Knockraha. An earlier (2004) proposal ran from Ballincollig to Glanmire. The timeline sees preparatory work in the 2020s and delivery in the 2030s. There could potentially be exits for Glanmire, Mayfield, the completed M20 motorway and Ballincollig with the new Cork North Ring Road.

The current "Cork North Ring Road" is the R635, which under CMATS would become part of a "Northern Distributor Road" running inside the North Ring Road. CMATS also envisages a "Southern Distributor Road" parallel to the middle section of the South Ring Road, intended to take much of the commuter traffic, freeing the ring road for through traffic bypassing the city.

== List of exits ==
km	mi	Junction	Destinations	Notes
0.5	0.3	1	N22 ‒ City Centre (western approach), Ballincollig (East), Blarney	Continues as N22 dual carriageway.
2.5	1.6	2	L2222 ‒ Curraheen, Bishopstown (West)	No westbound entrance.
4	2.5	3	N71 ‒ Skibbereen, Bandon, Bishopstown (westbound); N71 ‒ Skibbereen, R849 – Wilton, Bishopstown (eastbound)	
5	3.1	4	R641 ‒ Wilton L2450 – Doughcloyne	Westbound entrance to N40 and eastbound exit accessed from junction 3.
6.5	4	5	L1011 ‒ Togher	Eastbound entrance to N40 accessed from junction 6.
7.5	4.7	6	N27 ‒ City Centre, Cork Airport, Kinsale	L2455 – Togher L2460 – Grange L2548 – Turners Cross; Black Ash Park and Ride
9	5.6	7	R851 ‒ Douglas (West)	Eastbound exit and westbound entrance only.
9.5	5.9	8	R610 ‒ Douglas (East)	Eastbound exit only.
11	6.8	9	N28 ‒ Ringaskiddy, Carrigaline, Rochestown	
12.5	7.8	10	R852 – Mahon, Blackrock	
14.5	9	Jack Lynch Tunnel		
15	9.3	11	M8 – Dublin; N8 – City Centre (eastern approach), Limerick (N20) N25 – Waterford, Midleton	Little Island, Glanmire, Glounthaune
1.000 mi = 1.609 km; 1.000 km = 0.621 mi: Incomplete access; Route transition

== See also ==
- Roads in Ireland
- National primary road
- Regional road
