= Glenbrook, County Cork =

Village in County Cork, Ireland

Glenbrook Gleann an Fheileastraim
- Village
- Location in Ireland
- Coordinates: 51°51′42″N 08°20′00″W
- Country: Ireland
- Province: Munster
- County: County Cork
- Time zone: UTC+0 (WET)
  - Summer (DST): UTC-1 (IST (WEST))

Glenbrook (Irish: Gleann an Fheileastraim, meaning 'glen of the iris') is a village in the townland of Lackaroe, between Passage West and Monkstown in County Cork, Ireland. Monkstown, Glenbrook and Passage West are three villages along Cork Harbour's R610 route. The Cross River Ferry at Glenbrook links the Owenabue Valley with East Cork, Fota Island and Cobh.

== History ==
Glenbrook was originally a seaside resort with buildings like the two sets of Victorian Turkish baths which were established there. The first of these was the Royal Victoria Monkstown and Passage Baths, which opened in 1838. This was followed by Dr Timothy Curtin's hydropathic establishment.

Passage West, which also has a maritime tradition, is next to Glenbrook and the two are somewhat indistinguishable as there is no obvious border between the two. It is from here that Captain Roberts set out and crossed the Atlantic in the first passenger steamship, "The Sirius". A plaque, along with a piece of the ship, commemorates this journey and is sited next to the Cross River Ferry in Glenbrook. The old railway line, once a method of transport ferrying customers to the summer resort town and the Turkish baths, is now a walking trail next to Cork Harbour.

== Transport ==
Glenbrook railway station opened on 1 August 1902 and finally closed on 12 September 1932.

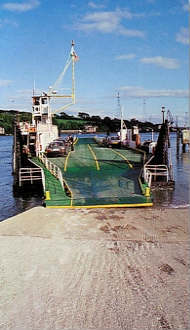
The Cross River ferry at Glenbrook

== See also ==
- List of towns and villages in Ireland
