= N29 road (Ireland) =

Road in Ireland

N29 road
- Bóthar N29

Route information
- Length: 3.55 km (2.21 mi)

Location
- Country: Ireland
- Primary destinations: County Kilkenny; Slieveroe, leaves N25; Crosses Waterford to New Ross Railway; Belview

Highway system
- Roads in Ireland; Motorways; Primary; Secondary; Regional

The N29 road (Belview Port Road) is a national primary road in Ireland. It connects the Port of Waterford at Belview, County Kilkenny to Waterford City via the N25. The road and port are located on the north bank of the River Suir.

The N25 (the Ross Road) leads west to Waterford and east to Rosslare Europort.

== See also ==
- Roads in Ireland
- Motorways in Ireland
- National secondary road
- Regional road
