= R612 road =

R612 road may refer to:

- R612 road (Ireland)
- R612 (South Africa)
