= R612 road (Ireland) =

Road in Ireland

R612 road
- Bóthar R612

Route information
- Length: 18 km (11 mi)

Location
- Country: Ireland
- Primary destinations: County Cork; Carrigaline; Crosshaven; Myrtleville; Fountainstown

Highway system
- Roads in Ireland; Motorways; Primary; Secondary; Regional
← R611	→ R613

The R612 road is a regional road in Ireland which runs from Carrigaline to Crosshaven, all in County Cork. The road is lasso shaped; two kilometers from its origin on Carrigaline it forks; both forks lead to Crosshaven. The southern-heading fork goes to Fountainstown and Myrtleville, before leading to Crosshaven. The eastern-heading fork goes straight to Crosshaven.

== See also ==
- Roads in Ireland
- National primary road
- National secondary road
