= Shanbally =

Village in County Cork, Ireland

Shanbally Irish: An Seanbhaile
- Village
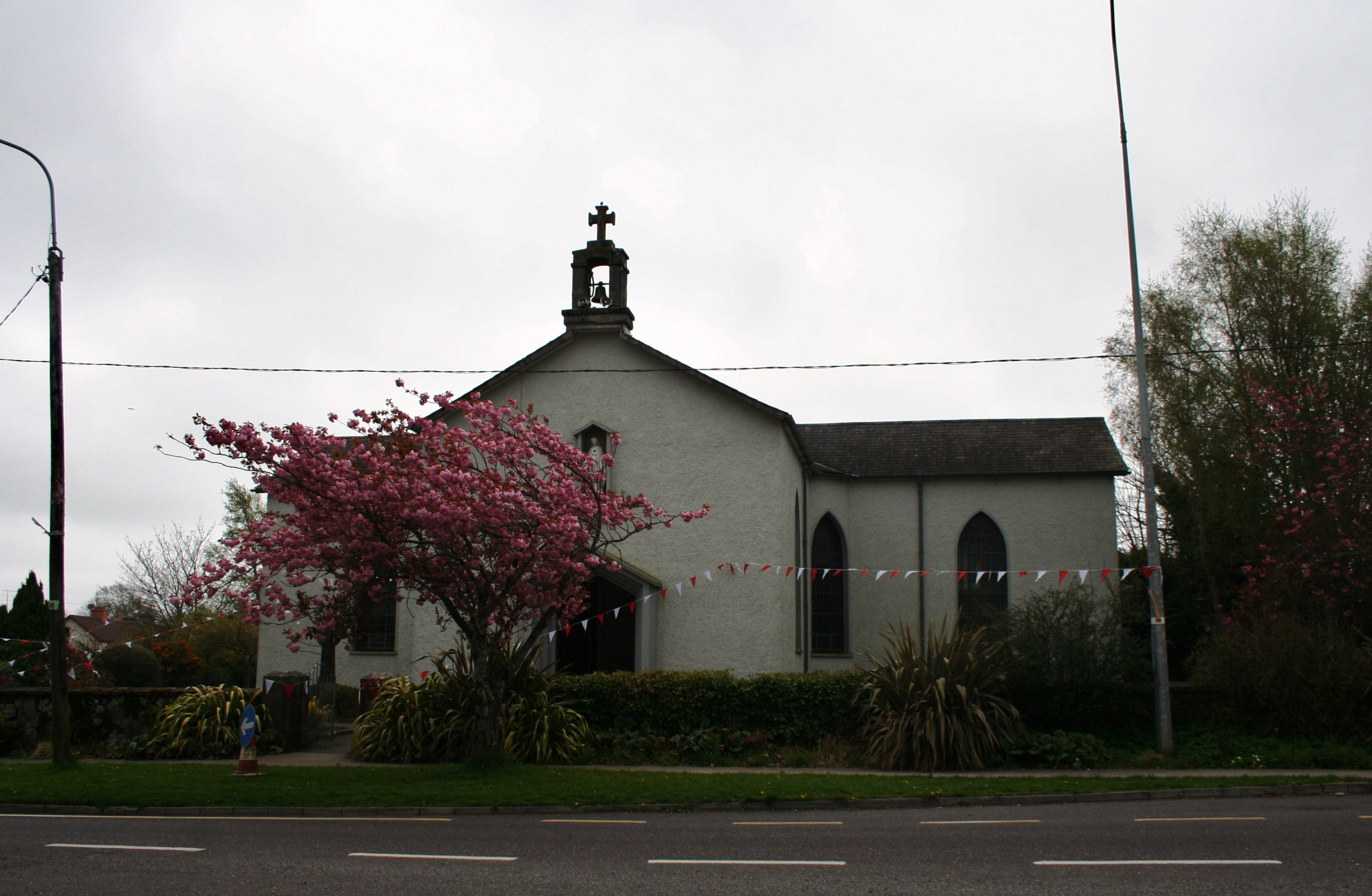
- Church of the Immaculate Heart of Mary, Shanbally

- Location in Ireland
- Coordinates: 51°49′55.54″N 08°21′11.69″W
- Country: Ireland
- Province: Munster
- County: County Cork

Population (2022)
  - Total: 350
- Time zone: UTC+0 (WET)
  - Summer (DST): UTC-1 (IST (WEST))

Shanbally (Irish: An Seanbhaile, meaning "the old town/homestead") is a small village located in south east County Cork on the N28 road. Shanbally is home to a Catholic church, a primary school, a pub, a shop and Shamrocks GAA club. The village is located close to Ringaskiddy, Monkstown and Carrigaline.

The local Catholic church is the church of the Immaculate Heart of Mary.

== See also ==
- List of towns and villages in Ireland
