= R611 road (Ireland) =

Road in Ireland

R611 road
- Bóthar R611
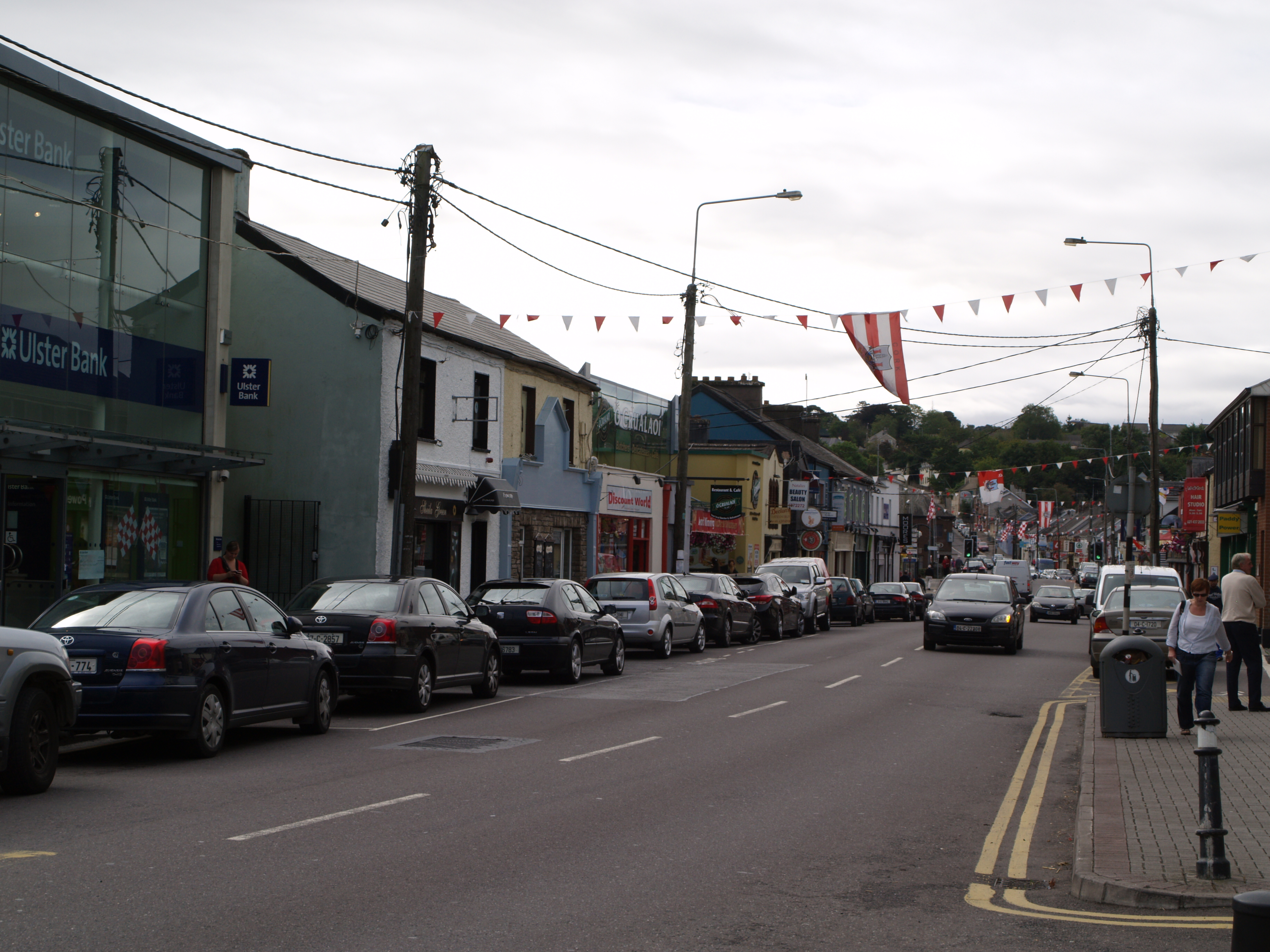
- Main Street, Carrigaline, on the R611

Route information
- Length: 17 km (11 mi)

Location
- Country: Ireland
- Primary destinations: County Cork; R611 meets N28 at Shannonpark Roundabout; Carrigaline; Ballyfeard; Belgooly

Highway system
- Roads in Ireland; Motorways; Primary; Secondary; Regional

The R611 road is a regional road in Ireland which runs from the N28 north of Carrigaline to Belgooly, all in County Cork.

The road is 17 km (11 mi) long.

== See also ==
- Roads in Ireland
- National primary road
- National secondary road
