= Dunkettle Interchange =

Road junction in Cork City, Ireland

- Interactive map of Dunkettle Interchange

Location
- Cork City, Ireland 51°54'11.4"N 8°22'57.2"W
- Coordinates: 51.903111°N 8.382635°W
- Roads at junction: M8; N25; N40; R623; L2998; L3004

Construction
- Opened: 1992
- Reconstructed: 1999 (flyover and 4th arm), 2024 (free-flow interchange)

The Dunkettle Interchange (Irish: Acomhal Dhún Citil) is a major road junction in Cork City, Ireland. It forms a junction between the M8, N25 and the N40, and further serves the R623 and local roads L2998 and L3004. On average, 95,000 vehicles use the junction on a daily basis.

The junction was originally an at-grade roundabout, with a flyover in the west-east direction constructed later. In 2018, a further civil engineering upgrade to make the interchange work on a free-flow basis was undertaken by Sisk. In February 2024 the rebuilt interchange costing €215 million was officially opened.

It should not be confused with the Dunkettle Roundabout which is around 750m to the west.

== History ==
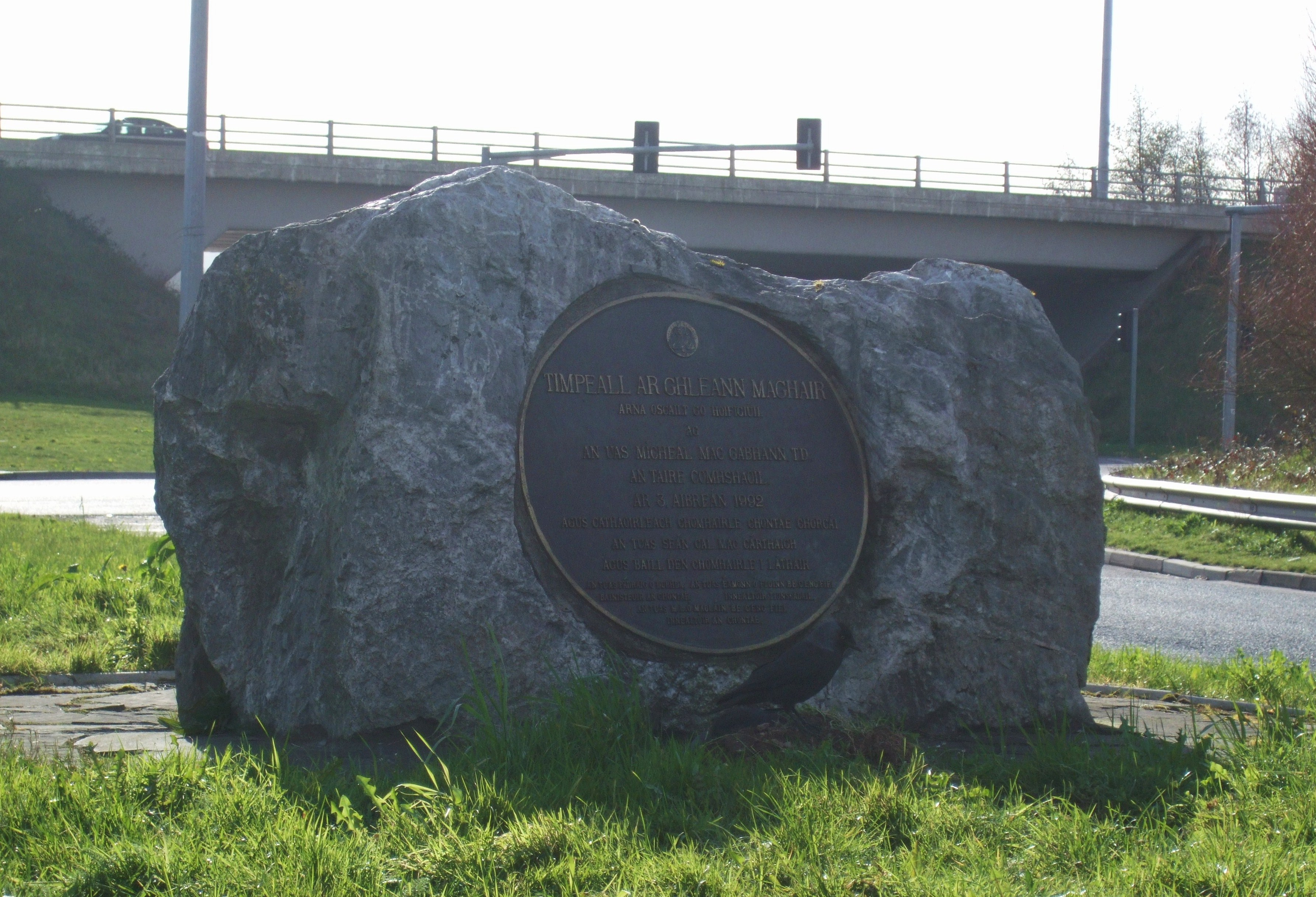
Plaque at Dunkettle Interchange, dated 3 April 1992

=== Initial developments ===
The Dunkettle Interchange was constructed in order to link the N25 to the newly constructed Glanmire bypass which formed part of the N8 at Dunkettle. The junction opened in 1992 along with the Glanmire bypass. At the time, the junction had three arms, along with two access sliproads to allow access to and from Glounthaune.

A further significant upgrade came in 1999 when, in the order to facilitate the opening of the new Jack Lynch Tunnel, a fourth arm heading southbound was added. At the same time, a flyover of the roundabout was added to accommodate increased traffic levels. Access slip roads into and out of Little Island were also added along with access to the tunnel management building.

A further upgrade was completed in 2006. This involved installing traffic lights on the roundabout in order to increase the capacity of the junction.

=== Further changes ===
Due to the volumes of traffic using the junction on a daily basis, the National Roads Authority (NRA) and Cork County Council decided that the junction was unfit for purpose. Jacobs Engineering was appointed by the NRA to create plans to make the junction free-flow in all movements. In June 2011, the NRA presented five different solutions to create a free-flow junction, and in 2013, a scheme was approved by the planning board.

By September 2015, a Capital Investment Plan was unveiled by the Irish government, which secured funding for the interchange. By July 2018, Sisk had been selected by Transport Infrastructure Ireland (TII) as the main contractor.

The rebuilt Dunkettle Interchange was officially opened by Tánaiste Micheál Martin on the 12 February 2024. The new development includes four roundabouts. The upgrade has also involved the installation of digital signage on the approach to the interchange and the N40 to provide information to drivers around journey times and traffic issues.

== Proposed railway station ==
In the mid-2020's Irish Rail announced plans to develop a park and ride railway station in the area.
