= R623 road (Ireland) =

Regional road in Ireland

R623 road
- Bóthar R623
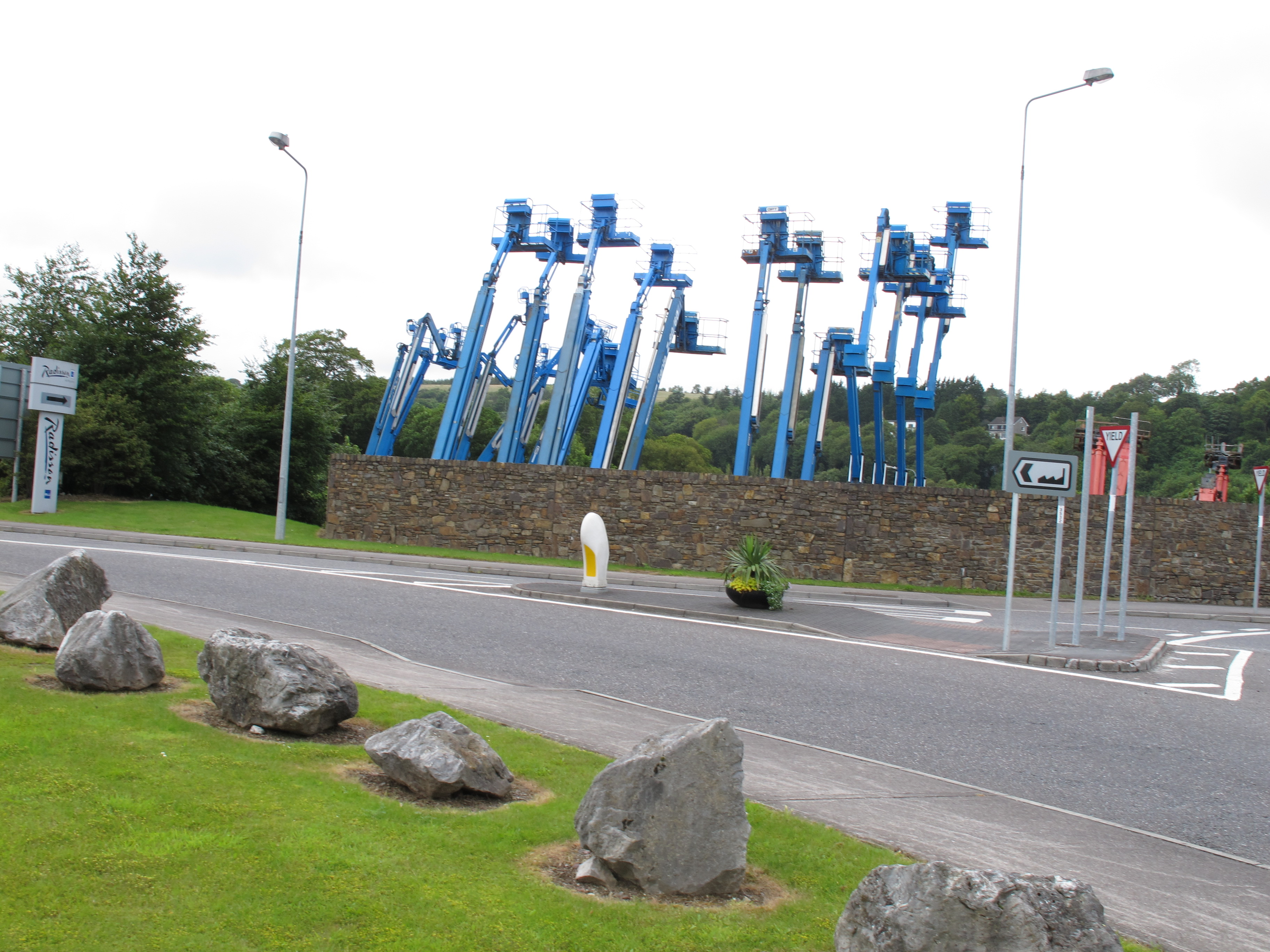
- Construction site by the R623 on Little Island

Route information
- Length: 3.5 km (2.2 mi)

Major junctions
- From: N25 at Inchera, County Cork
- To: N25 at Courtstown

Location
- Country: Ireland

Highway system
- Roads in Ireland; Motorways; Primary; Secondary; Regional
← R622	→ R624

The R623 road is a regional road in County Cork, Ireland. It is a loop road on Little Island from the N25. The R623 is 3.5 kilometres (2.2 mi) long.
