= Jack Lynch Tunnel =

Crossing of the River Lee in Cork

Coordinates: 51.899887°N 8.392017°W

Jack Lynch Tunnel Tollán Sheáin Uí Loingsigh
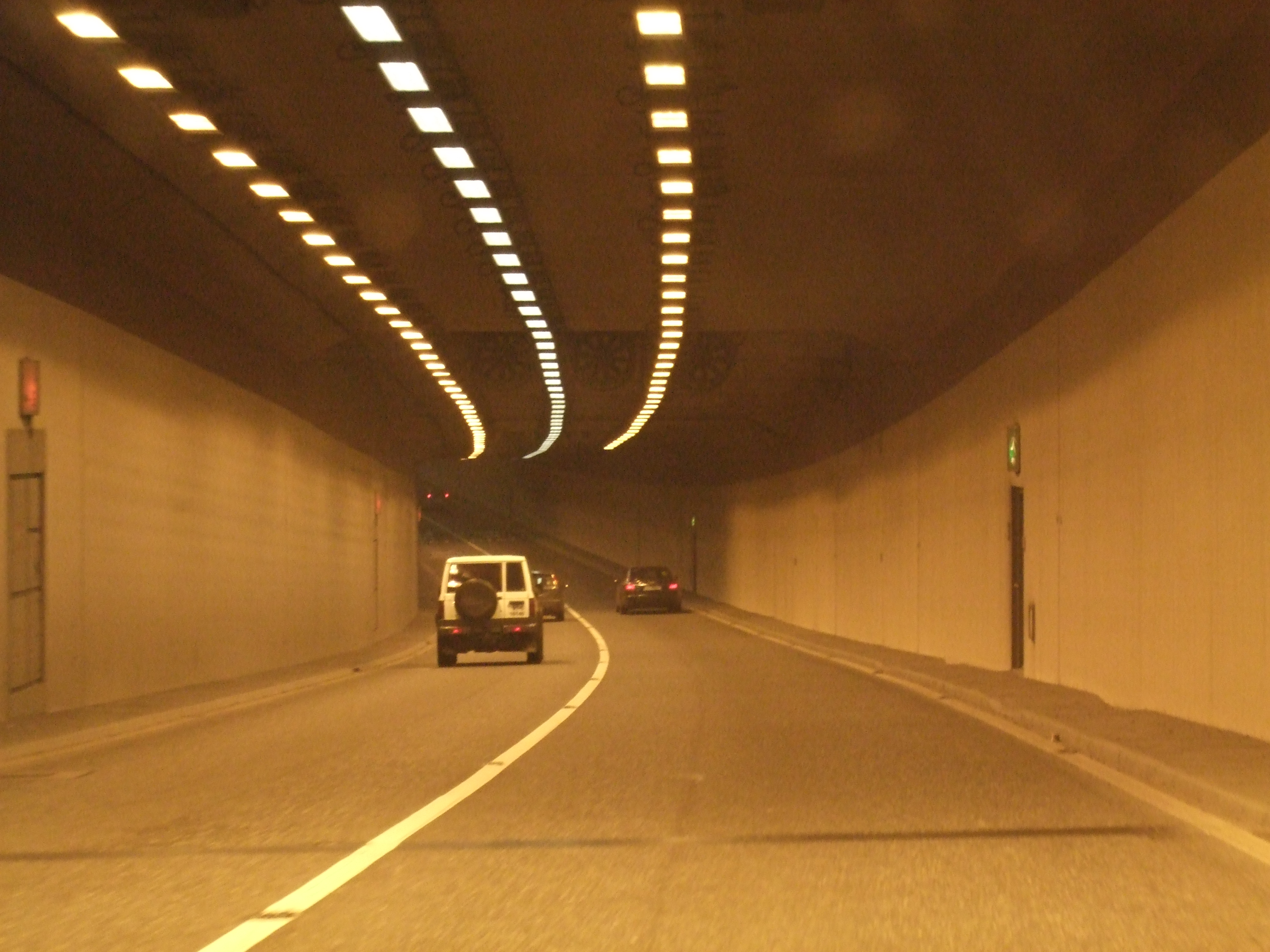
- The N40 through the interior of the southbound tube.
- Interactive map of Jack Lynch Tunnel; Tollán Sheáin Uí Loingsigh

Overview
- Location: Cork City, crossing the River Lee
- Route: N40

Operation
- Work began: 1995
- Opened: May 1999; 27 years ago
- Operator: Egis Road and Tunnel Operation Ireland

Technical
- Length: 610 metres (670 yd) (immersed tube tunnel section); 1.8 kilometres (1.1 mi) (total roadway)
- No. of lanes: 2 cells of 2 each
- Operating speed: 80 km/h
- Tunnel clearance: 8.5 metres (28 ft) (external)
- Width: 24.5 metres (80.4 ft) (external)

The Jack Lynch Tunnel (Irish: Tollán Sheáin Uí Loingsigh) is an immersed tube tunnel and an integral part of the N40 road network in Cork, Ireland. It is named after former Taoiseach, Jack Lynch, a native of Cork.

It takes the road under the River Lee. North of the tunnel, the ring-road joins the M8 motorway to Dublin (north) and N8 road to the city centre (west), with the N25 commencing east to Waterford. The tunnel was completed in May 1999, and carried nearly 40,000 vehicles per day as of 2005. This number rose further as the N40 ring-road's upgrades progressed, with the opening of the Kinsale road roundabout flyover in 2006 and subsequent upgrades to the Sarsfield Road and Bandon Road Roundabouts. Traffic in 2016 was approximately 63,000 vehicles a day up from 59,000 in 2013. By 2026, average daily traffic levels had risen to 71,888.

The tunnel has two cells, each with two traffic lanes and two footpaths, and a central bore for use in an emergency only. Pedestrians and cyclists are expressly forbidden from using the tunnel. The exclusion of cyclists has been somewhat controversial as the feeder road is a dual-carriageway and so is open to cyclists, but the by-law is applied because of space limitations and the obvious danger of cyclists in an enclosed tunnel.

== History ==
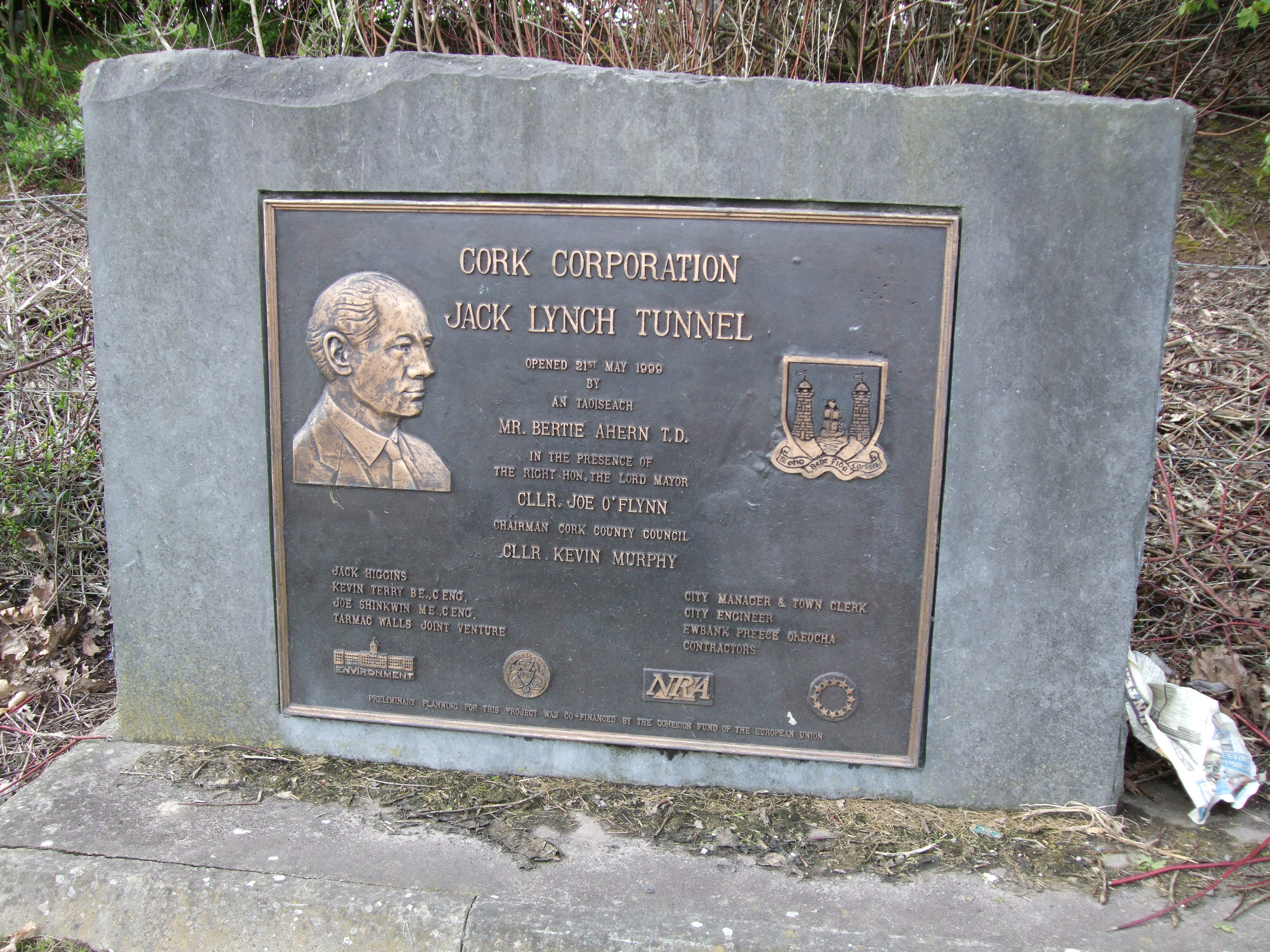
Jack Lynch Tunnel commemorative plaque

The idea of a crossing of the River Lee downstream of the city centre came from civil engineers employed by Cork Local Authorities and the central government's Department of the Environment in the late 1970s. Cork's suburbs were expanding and traffic was rising as car ownership increased, but the city centre's street plan, laid out in the late Middle Ages, was ill-equipped to cope. The engineers reasoned that the congestion in the city centre and its radial routes was quickly reaching intolerable levels. They pushed through Cork's "LUTS" – Land Use and Transportation Study – plan, to lay down a twenty five-year plan for the orderly growth of transport and land use in the greater Cork area. The transportation proposals combined construction of elements of a ring road, a downstream crossing, and computerised management of traffic on existing roads. This group of engineers became the Technical Steering Committee for the LUTS Plan and at that time consisted of Sean McCarthy, the former City Engineer, W.A. "Liam" Fitzgerald, his successor as City Engineer, Liam Mullins, Cork's County Engineer, John O'Regan, his deputy, B.J. O'Sullivan, the Cork Harbour Engineer, and Sean Walsh and Declan O'Driscoll, the two Assistant Chief Engineering Advisers at the Department of the Environment responsible for the region. The location and type of crossing was not established by the LUTS plan.

No road development in Ireland prior to that date had required such a large investment, and therefore the plan met with some opposition on the grounds of cost. In 1980, Cork Corporation commissioned DeLeuw Chadwick O’hEocha, engineering consultants, to undertake a feasibility study of options for a major highway crossing of the River Lee downstream from the city centre. A team led by J.D. Shinkwin, Director of DeLeuw Chadwick O’hEocha, performed the study. The first stage of the report established that the crossing should be located in Dunkettle, rather than at Tivoli, closer to the city centre. The second stage endorsed an immersed tube tunnel as the preferred scheme versus a bridge (either fixed or opening span). The primary reasons were that a tunnel would have a lower construction cost relative to its utility, shorter approach gradients, lower environmental impact and no effect on shipping once built. While the construction costs for a two lane tunnel were marginally higher than for a two lane high-level bridge, the steep upward ramp for a high-level bridge would slow down cars and trucks as they climbed the bridge, thus reducing its peak capacity dramatically versus a tunnel or, alternatively, necessitating the addition of a climbing lane with significant additional costs. The other alternative considered by the Steering Committee was an opening span bridge. While this solution would avoid the ramp problem of a high-level bridge, traffic would halt whenever the bridge had to open. Shipping volumes into Cork's port area was rising steadily in the 1980s, which meant that an opening span bridge was becoming less attractive every year.

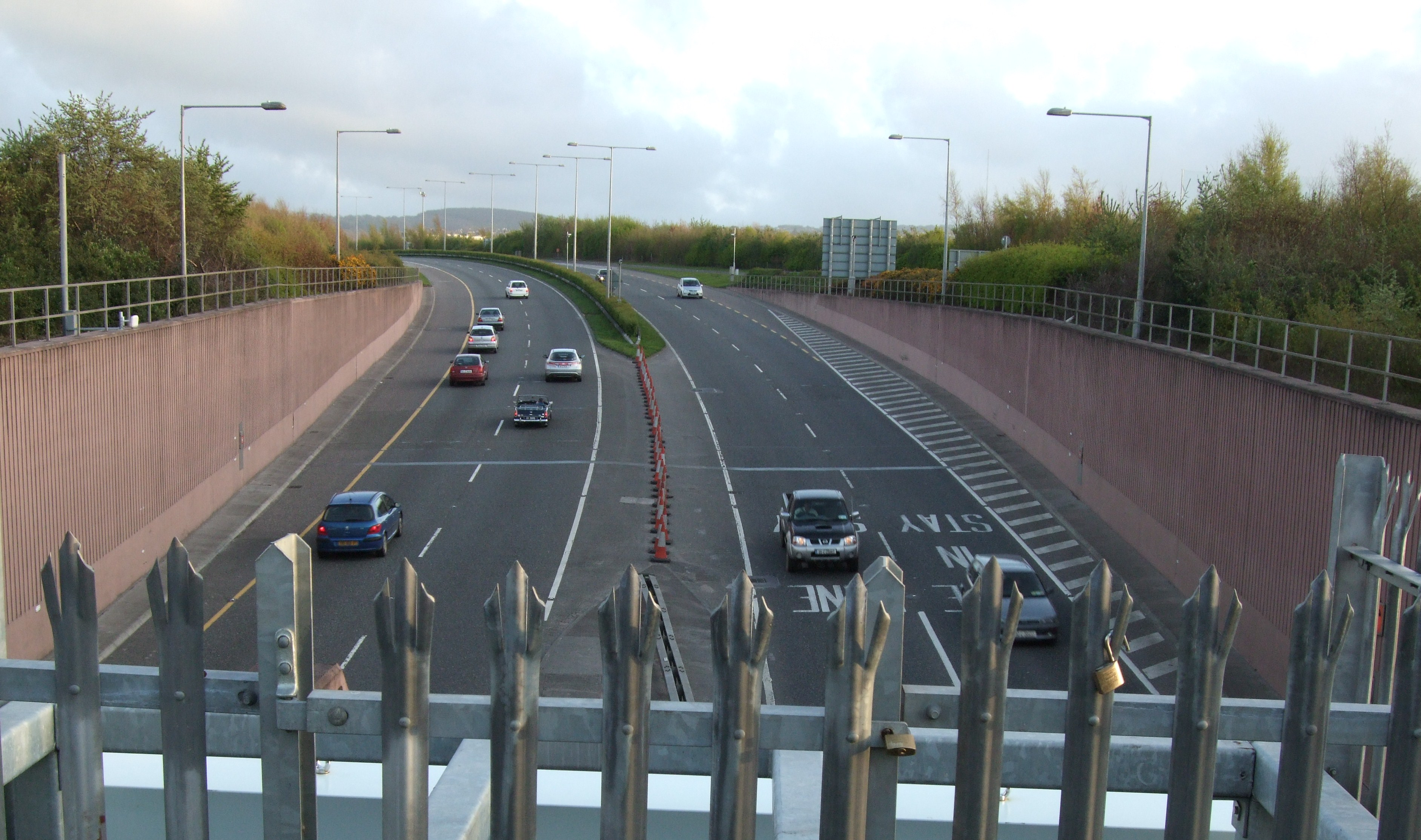
The N40 at the southern entry/exit point of the tunnel

A sworn Public Inquiry into Cork Corporation's application for a "bridge order" providing for a two-lane tunnel was held in October 1985. The required inspector's report was submitted in January 1987 to the Minister for the Environment, Pádraig Flynn. At that point, the report remained on the minister's desk for some time. The formal reason for this was that the minister "decided that the question of the timing of the crossing should be considered in the broader context of the preparation by the Department of proposals for the medium to long term development of national roads. In this context the operational programme for roads … includes the proposal for the commencement of the downstream crossing during the programme period 1989–1993".

In 1989, the government recommended a further feasibility study to consider the need for a crossing and the technical, economic and operational aspects of the various crossing options. The study confirmed the findings of the original Feasibility Study. A further Public Inquiry was held, with hearings in July and December 1990, which considered further the alternative of a four lane crossing rather than the planned two lane crossing.

In 1992, the Minister approved a Bridge Order for a four lane immersed tube tunnel. In the intervening time, the Irish government had also established the National Roads Authority (NRA) to advance the long-term development of the national roads network. Declan O'Driscoll was appointed the Chief Engineer of that authority and together with J.D. Shinkwin, Director of Ewbank Preece OhEocha, and W.A. Fitzgerald, Cork City Engineer, formed an informal Technical Steering Committee for the Tunnel Project.

== Financing and contracting ==
The IR£70 million design and construct contract was awarded by the Cork Corporation on behalf of the National Roads Authority. The NRA received financial assistance from the Cohesion Fund of the European Union.

In the early 90s, Ewbank Preece OhEocha (formerly DeLeuw Chadwick OhEocha, and later to become part of Mott MacDonald) supervised a major geotechnical investigation, conducted a hydraulic study of the river, and carried out an environmental impact study. Ewbank Preece OhEocha, in association with Symonds Travers Morgan, produced a conceptual design and tender documents for Cork Corporation on a design and construct format based on geometric and performance specification. Thirteen parties showed interest in the contract. From these, four consortia were selected and Cork Corporation made a final contract decision in December 1994. As is typical on a large-scale project of this type, the chosen contractor was a joint venture of Tarmac Walls JV, formed by Tarmac Construction, now known as Carillion, and P.J. Walls (Civil) Ltd., part of Ireland's Walls Group. Subcontractors then handled many of the key tasks of construction.

== Construction ==
Construction involved the excavation of a large casting basin where the tunnel elements or pieces were constructed. After construction of elements was complete, the casting basin was filled with water and joined to the adjacent River Lee, each element was floated out and sunk into position into a carefully dredged river bed. The road surface was laid and the tunnel opened for traffic in 1999.

=== Construction techniques ===
The chosen method of construction was the immersed tube technique. In this method, a trench is dredged in the bed of the water channel. Tunnel sections are constructed in the dry, for example in a casting basin, a fabrication yard, on a ship-lift platform or in a factory unit. The ends of the section are then temporarily sealed with bulkheads. Each tunnel section is transported to the tunnel site – usually floating, occasionally on a barge, or assisted by cranes. In the Jack Lynch Tunnel, the 610-metre-long reinforced concrete immersed tube tunnel is made up of five elements, each around 122 metres long, 24.5 metres wide and 8.5 metres high. The northern approach was formed by a 120-metre-long floated open 'boat' section – the first of its kind.

=== Excavation and dredging ===
Dredging International was the chosen dredging contractor, and the value of the dredging contract is stated by them at €12.4 million. The scope of works consisted of dredging the main tunnel trench and subsequently backfilling the completed construction with sand and gravel. The contract provided also for restoration of the riverbed profile and the addition of a rock protection layer. Between May 1996 and March 1999, the company excavated 785,000 tonnes of silt and alluvium and 300,000 tonnes of sand and gravel.

The trench was dredged primarily by a series of specialised vessels, in several stages and with different equipment. Much of the main trench for the Lee Tunnel was excavated by the backhoe dredger "Zenne". Two barges were used to transport the dredged material 19 km (12 mi) downriver and from there to a disposal site four miles offshore. The cutter dredger "Vlaanderen XIX" removed the underlying fluvioglacial material. A second cutter dredger, "Vlaanderen XV", was deployed to breach the casting basin perimeter, or "bund". A rock layer was encountered on part of the trench line, which was dealt with by the jack-up platform "Zeebouwer". The "Big Boss" vessel was employed to remove the rock. This backhoe dredger was equipped with a "Backhoover" (in effect, a "mini" precision dredger). This system proved extremely effective in removing very thin layers of recently deposited material immediately prior to immersion of the tunnel elements.

=== Constructing the immersed tube ===
Building the tunnel structure required the pre-casting of 5 tunnel segments and an open boat unit. These were constructed in a casting basin located partially on the line of the tunnel south of the river at Mahon. Each segment weighed approx 27,000 tonnes. Contractors Tarmac Walls JV engaged RMD Kwikform, a global construction formwork and shoring solutions company, for the formwork on the tunnel and open section elements of the river crossing.

Each box section comprised two 9.8-metre-wide dual lane traffic tubes and a 1.35-metre-wide twin walled central tube for services and emergency access. The 1.2-metre-thick base slab was cast first, followed by the 50-centimetre-thick central walls. The outer walls and roof were cast together in a single operation, in six nominal 20-metre lengths, using special travelling formwork. This was struck inside the formed section, moved along to the next length and then jacked up into position, each within a 72-hour cycle. Each 1000-cubic-metre pour required approximately 1500 square metres of formwork. The inside shutters for the outer walls were vertical steel section panels and Alform Beam walers, which were attached to the top slab of the special steel traveller, while the outer shutters were crane handled vertical steel section panels with Alform Beam or steel channel walers.

The open top boat unit, measuring approx 40 metres wide (including two 7.2-metre wings at its widest point), 120 metres long, and up to 10 metres high, was cast in two operations using standard formwork. The boat unit and all the tunnel section elements were cast using grade 40N concrete with a percentage of ggbfs cement replacement, reinforcement being high strength and 16 to 40 mm diameter.

== Tunnel operation ==
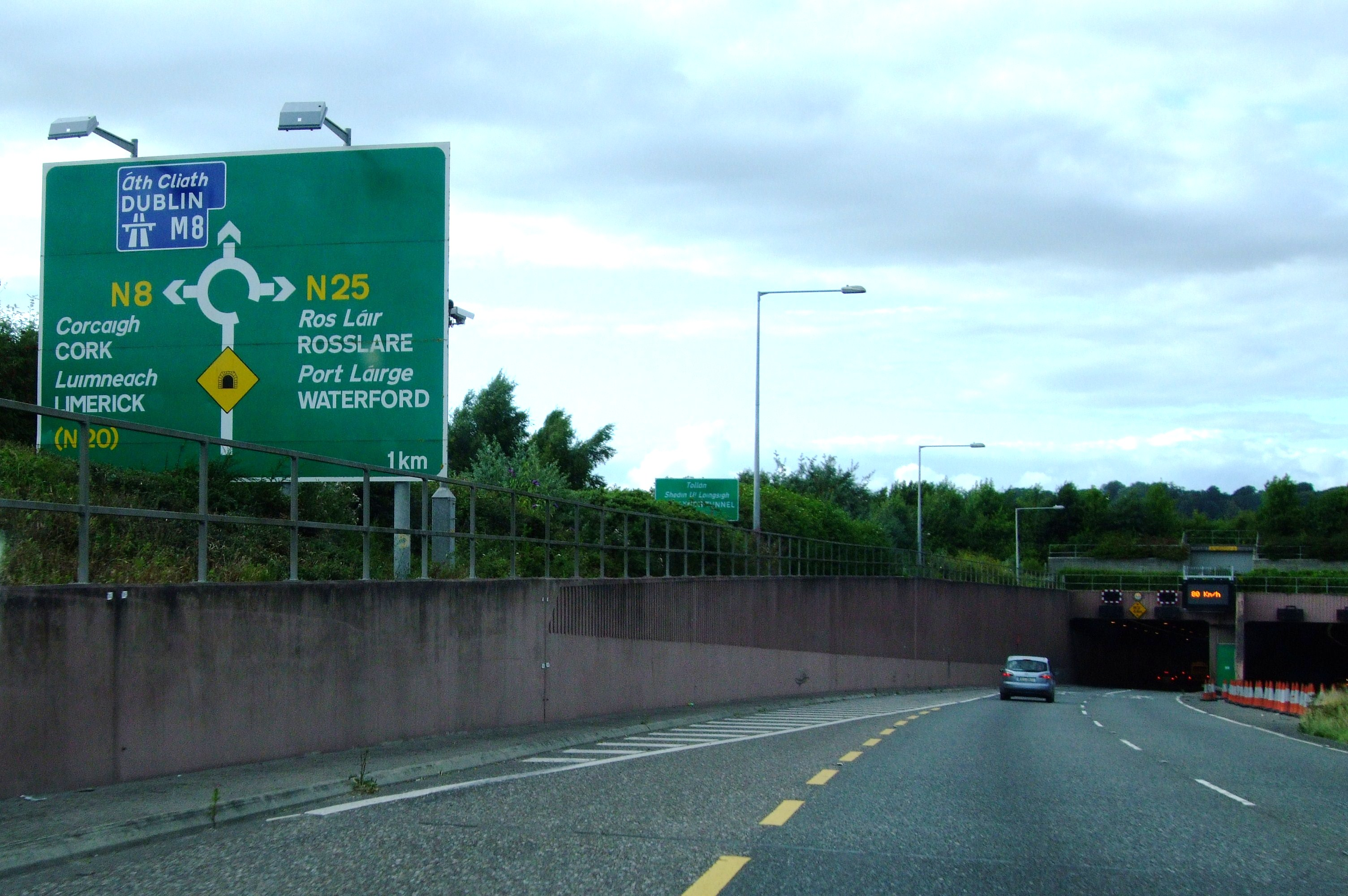
Entrance to the northbound bore

The tunnel is currently operated and maintained by Egis Road and Tunnel Operation on behalf of Transport Infrastructure Ireland. Egis took on that role in 2015. Prior to that it had been operated and maintained by Cork City Council.

The road surface was laid in 1998/1999 and the tunnel opened for traffic on 21 May 1999, roughly 20 years after the first formal studies had been prepared. The final cost of the whole scheme including feeder roads and not just the tunnel itself was IR£105 million (approx €133 million). The tunnel has two separate two-lane bores (each lane 3.75 m wide). There is a service walkway about 1 metre across which doubles as an emergency escape route. During periods of maintenance, one tube may be closed and the other used for bi-directional traffic. The environment within the tunnel is controlled by a closed circuit TV system (CCTV), traffic control and Supervisory Control and Data Acquisition (SCADA) system. External photometers linked to the SCADA system provide a level of tunnel lighting most compatible with ambient light levels outside. To assist drivers in adjusting their eyes, lighting gradually brightens as they approach an exit.

There are six emergency exits in each traffic bore for pedestrians that lead into the central bore (pedestrian exit), the exit doors are at each end of the central bore.

Pumping equipment, located inside the tunnel, pumps any run off water into the River Lee. Jet fans also located within niches in the roof of the immersed tube sections provide longitudinal ventilation, and the tunnel is equipped with fire and life safety equipment.

The maximum height of vehicles that can use the tunnel is 4.65 metres. Signage is displayed on the approaches and entrances to the tunnel warning users of the height restriction. Over-height vehicle detection systems are positioned on the approach roads to detect over-height vehicles. When an over-height vehicle is detected, Variable Message Signs (VMS) at the tunnel entrance change to warn the driver that their vehicle is over-height.

Despite the cost of its construction and operation the tunnel is not tolled. The Feasibility Study for the tunnel envisaged that the crossing could have a toll of 30 pence (in 1981 IR£) (approximately €1.07 in 2020), but the concept of a toll was dropped after political opposition. It was felt that, because of the proximity of the tunnel to the city, the imposition of tolls would tend to encourage some drivers to avoid the tunnel and continue using the city centre streets thus minimising the benefits of the tunnel.

An immersed tube tunnel of similar length has been constructed in Limerick, as part of Limerick's south ring road. The Limerick Tunnel was constructed under a Public-Private Partnership scheme signed with Direct Route (Limerick) Ltd. and is tolled (and has resulted in some political opposition in Limerick as the Jack Lynch Tunnel is also an inner city relief route but is not tolled).

== See also ==
- Roads in Ireland
