= N25 road (Ireland) =

National primary road in Ireland

N25 road
- Bóthar N25

Route information
- Part of E01 / E30
- Length: 188.05 km (116.85 mi)

Location
- Country: Ireland
- Primary destinations: (bypassed routes in italics): Cork City; Dunkettle Interchange; County Cork; Little Island; N25 Carrigtwohill-Cobh Interchange; Midleton; Castlemartyr; Killeagh; Youghal; County Waterford; Kinsalebeg; Grange; Gorteen; Dungarvan; Lemybrien; Kilmacthomas; Kilmeaden; Waterford City; County Kilkenny; Glenmore; County Wexford; New Ross; Wexford Town; Killinick; Tagoat; Kilrane; Rosslare; Rosslare Harbour

Highway system
- Roads in Ireland; Motorways; Primary; Secondary; Regional

The N25 road is a national primary road in Ireland, forming the route from Cork to Rosslare Europort via Waterford City. The road is part of the E30 European route and a short section is also part of the E01 European route. It forms part of the proposed Atlantic Corridor route.

== Route ==
Up to 22 February 2012, the Cork South Ring Road was designated as part of the N25. However, on 23 February, this section of road was redesignated as N40 and hence from this date, the N25 now commences at the Dunkettle Interchange. From the Dunkettle Interchange the N25 commences east as the East Cork Parkway dual-carriageway, with interchanges for Fota Island and Cobh, and also Carrigtwohill. The next major destination on the route is Midleton.

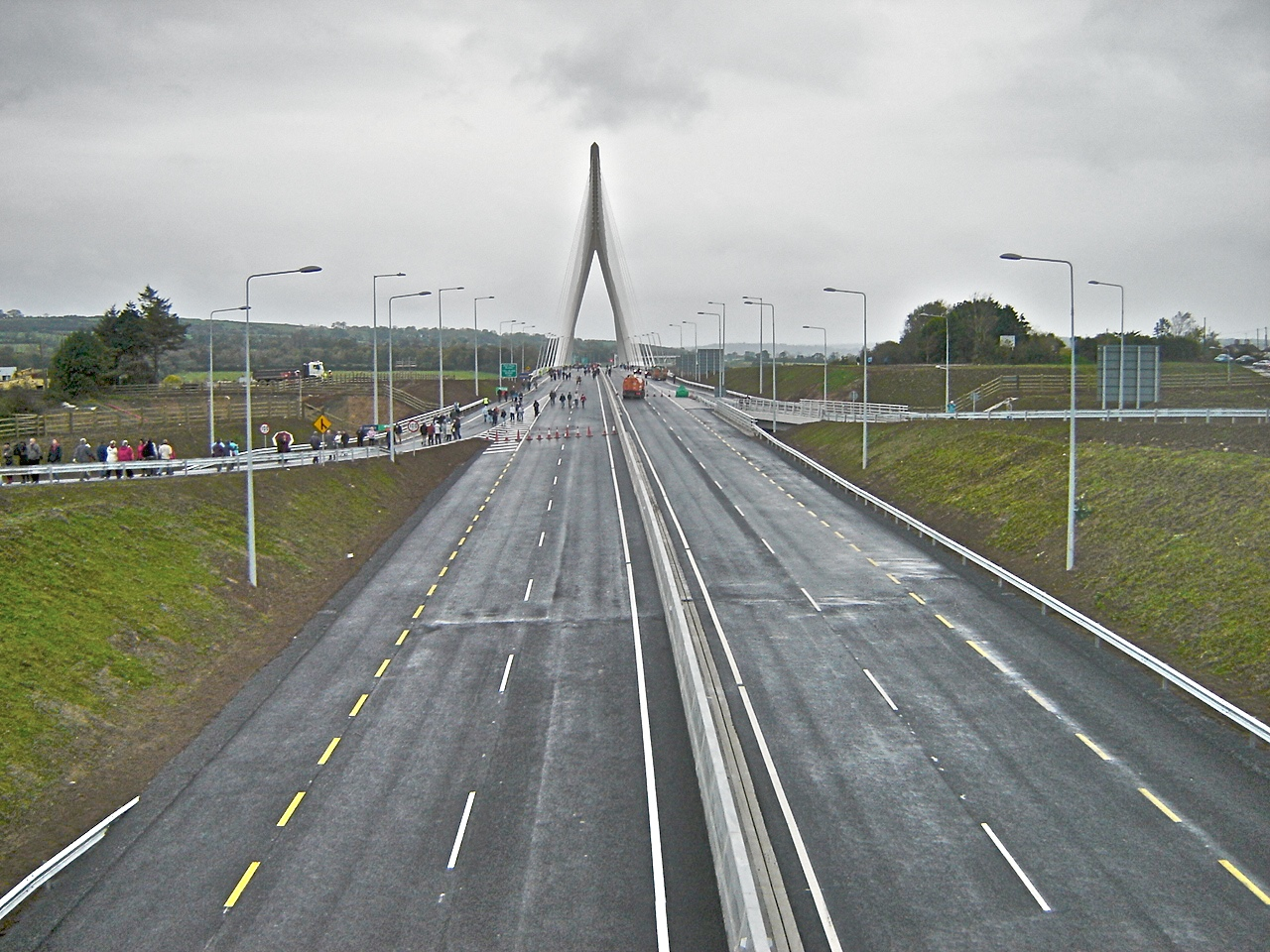
N25 Waterford City bypass

The dual-carriageway ends after bypassing Midleton with an ordinary two-lane road continuing east to Youghal. At Youghal a single carriageway bypass was completed in 2003, bringing the road around the west of the town to the northern side of Youghal. Here the road crosses the River Blackwater into County Waterford. Northeast of this, the road was widened as part of the N25 Kinsalebeg project. This consisted of widening of 3.5 kilometers of single carriageway to include a hard shoulder on both sides of the road. The route passes Dungarvan, with a future bypass at preliminary design stage, before meeting the N72 which makes its way to Killarney and County Kerry via Mallow, County Cork, Fermoy and Lismore, County Waterford. The N72 provides an alternative route to Kerry from and north of County Cork from Waterford and Wexford without going near Cork City and the Dunkettle Interchange. Then reaching Kilmeaden west of Waterford city and onto the bypass of the city itself. Beginning at Kilmeaden, it passes the Woodstown historic settlement before crossing the River Suir (via a cable stay bridge of about 475m in length) between Gracedieu in County Waterford and Grannagh in County Kilkenny. The bypass meets the M9 Motorway which leads to Dublin, Carlow, Kilkenny and Mullinavat and N24 which leads to Limerick, Tipperary, Cahir, Clonmel and Carrick On Suir at the Grannagh interchange, before joining the old N25 east of Slieverue. The bypass connects to the Outer Ring Road and the old N25 via a road known as the Western Link. (The bypass as a whole contains 23 km (14 mi) of dual carriageway* and 14 km (8.7 mi) of single carriageway.) The bypass is a tolled road.

From Waterford, the N25 moves north to cross the River Barrow into County Wexford further up its estuary, bypassing New Ross over Ireland's longest bridge, the Rose Fitzgerald Kennedy Bridge, since 29 January 2020. The existing N25 into New Ross was redesignated as the R723 at that time. East of the town, the N30 diverges and connects northeast to Enniscorthy, Clonroche and the M11 Dublin – Wexford motorway. The N25 continues east to Wexford and meets the end of the N11 road which comes from Dublin and all the towns and villages including Enniscorthy at the New Ross Road Roundabout positioned west of the town. The N25 skirts the edge of the town around to the south and passes west of Tagoat and Rosslare to descend to reach Rosslare Harbour.

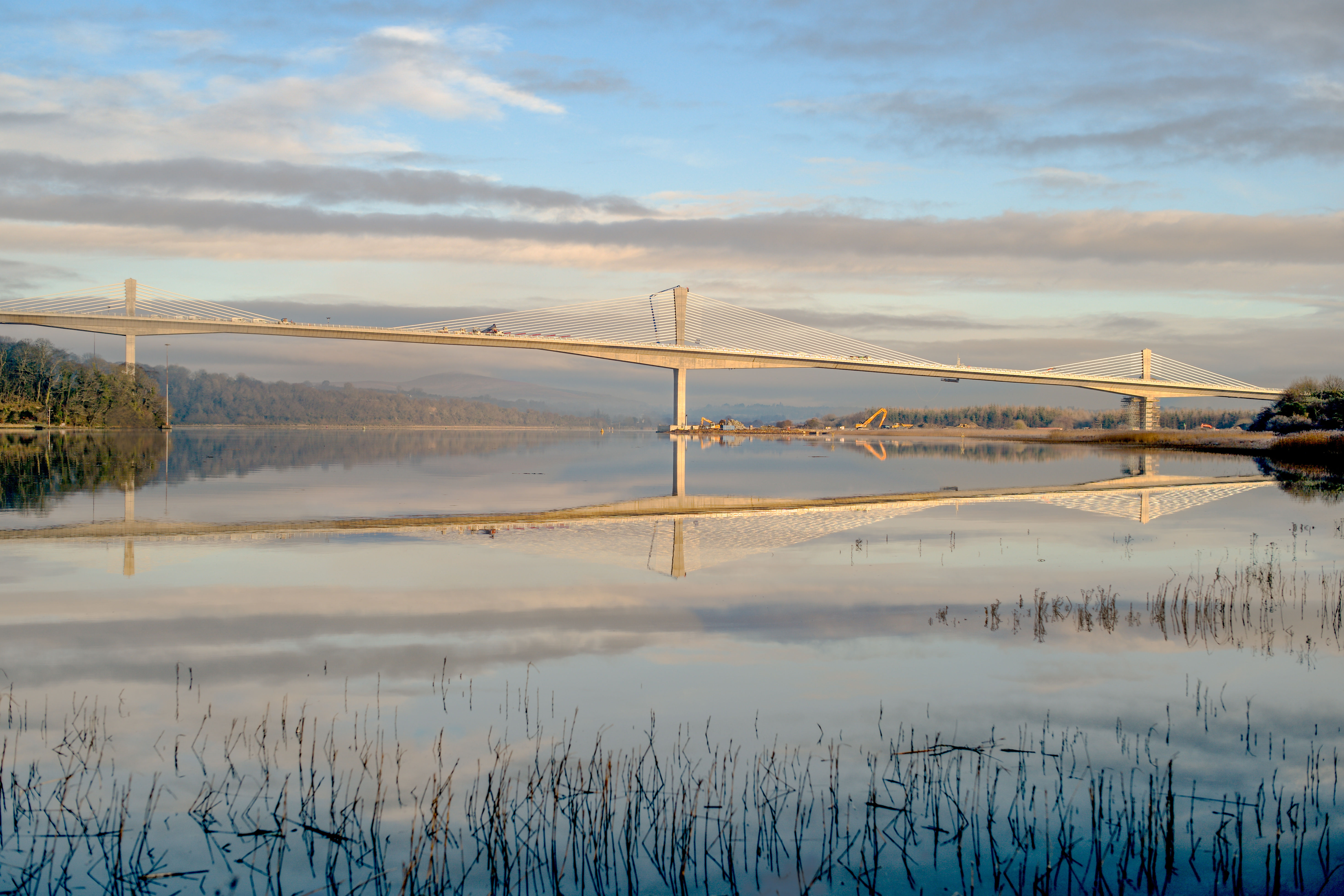
Rose Fitzgerald Kennedy Bridge, New Ross bypass

== Proposed developments ==
Some sections of the route have been proposed for upgrade to motorway standard. Part of the N25 dual carriageway in Midleton is to have all its junctions grade-separated and all direct accesses removed from the route (by the construction of a parallel road), thus making it suitable for upgrade to motorway status.

As of the early 21st century, TII was examining the possibility of a new road from Midleton to Youghal, with route options being investigated. As part of the Atlantic Corridor road scheme, the section of road between Waterford and Rosslare Europort was proposed to be built as high quality dual carriageway or motorway standard. In early 2022, it was announced that due to a funding shortfall, the portion from Carrigtwohill to Midleton would not be upgraded.

== Light aircraft crash ==
On 27 March 2017, a light aircraft crashed in a field adjacent to the road, killing the elderly pilot. It was one of three major aviation incidents involving Ireland in March 2017, with the Coastguard and Wales crash.

== Junctions ==
N25 - Dunkettle to Midelton
Westbound	Junction	Eastbound
Dunkettle Interchange M8(Dublin), N40(Cork) Road continues as N8	J1	Dunkettle Interchange M8(Dublin), N40(Cork) Start of dual carriageway
R623, Glounthaune, Little Island	J2	R623, Glounthaune, Little Island
R624, Cobh, Carrigtwohill	J3	R624, Cobh, Carrigtwohill
Carrigtwohill, Midleton	J4	Carrigtwohill, Midleton
Midleton	J5	Midleton
Midleton, Whitegate Start of dual carriageway	Lake view roundabout	Midleton, Whitegate End of dual carriageway

== See also ==
- Roads in Ireland
- Motorways in Ireland
- National secondary road
- Regional road
