= Crosshaven =

Village in Cork Harbour, Ireland

Crosshaven Bun an Tábhairne
- Village
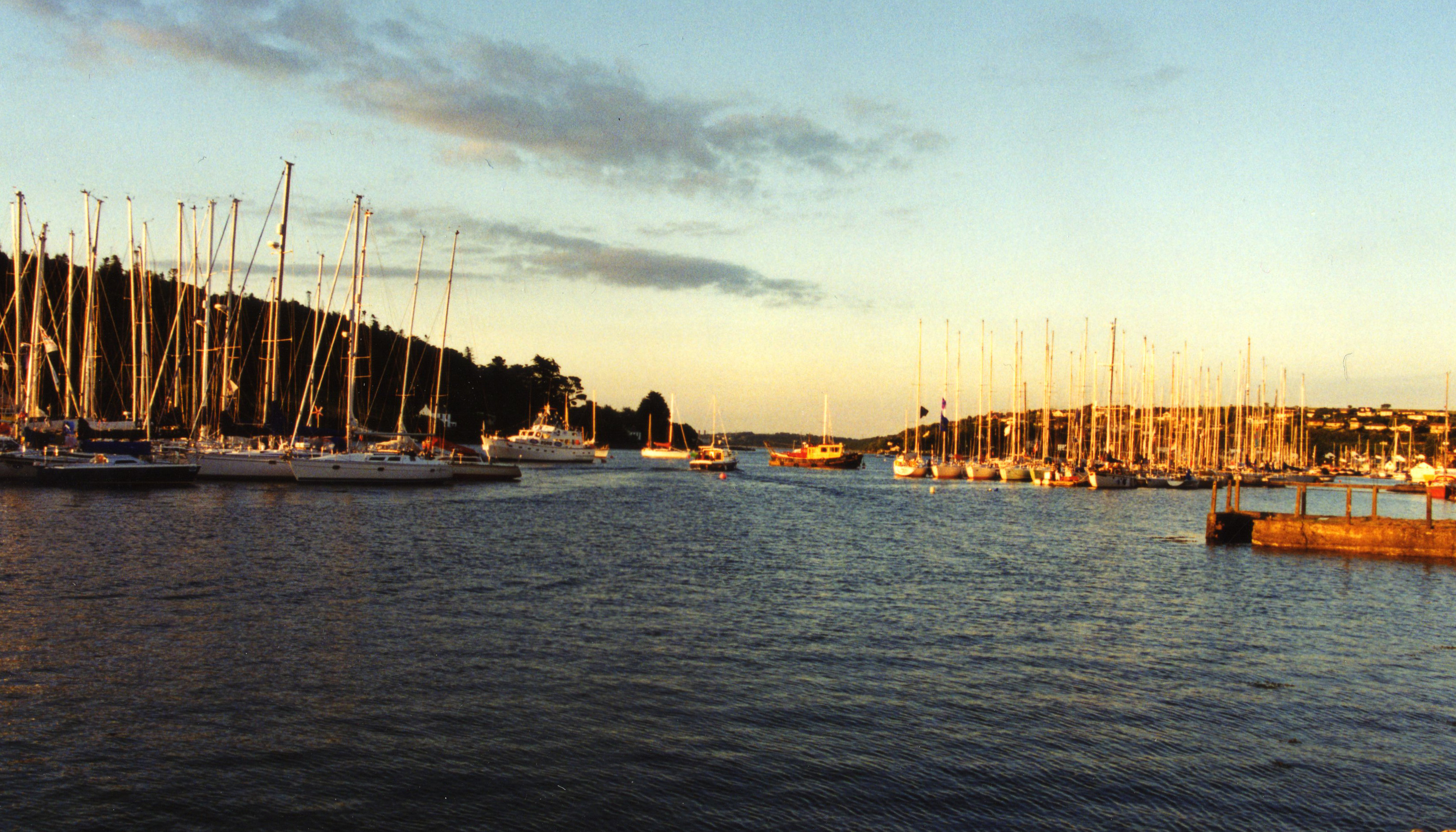
- Crosshaven

- Location in Ireland
- Coordinates: 51°48′07″N 08°17′43″W
- Country: Ireland
- Province: Munster
- County: County Cork
- Elevation: 40 m (130 ft)

Population (2022)
  - Total: 3,263
- Time zone: UTC+0 (WET)
  - Summer (DST): UTC-1 (IST (WEST))
- Irish Grid Reference: W792606

Crosshaven (Irish: Bun an Tábhairne) is a village in County Cork, Ireland. It is in lower Cork Harbour at the mouth of the River Owenabue, across from Currabinny Wood, 15 km south-east of the centre of Cork city. Originally a fishing village, from the 19th century, the economy of the area became more reliant on a growing tourism industry.

== Name ==
The modern Irish name for Crosshaven village is Bun an Tábhairne. While some sources link the word tábhairne to the English word "tavern", other sources suggest that it is a corruption of "tSabhairne" a grammatical form of the word "Sabhrann" the name of a local river. Bun refers to "river mouth" when in reference to placenames. Therefore, the name is potentially translated as "mouth of the River Sabhrann". The old Irish name for the east side of the village was Cros tSeáin or "John's Cross", from which the English name derives.

== History ==
Crosshaven was originally a Viking settlement, part of what was known as the 'Ostman's Tancred', after Cork city became a fortified English stronghold.

According to local legend, Sir Francis Drake hid a small squadron from a larger Spanish fleet upstream from Crosshaven on the River Owenabue at Tubberavoid, now called Drake's Pool. There is no evidence for this story, which is first recorded in 1750 by Charles Smith, who places it in 1589 after the Spanish Armada; Julian Corbett in 1890 said it could only have happened in during the 1573–75 campaign of the 1st Earl of Essex.

The local secondary school, Coláiste Mhuire, was founded by an aunt of James Joyce, and the town is mentioned twice in Joyce's novel Ulysses.

Nearby coastal artillery and military forts, Fort Templebreedy and Camden Fort Meagher, were British outposts until the Treaty Ports installations were relinquished in 1938. Camden is located on the headland of Rams Head and is occasionally open to the public.

== Economy and tourism ==
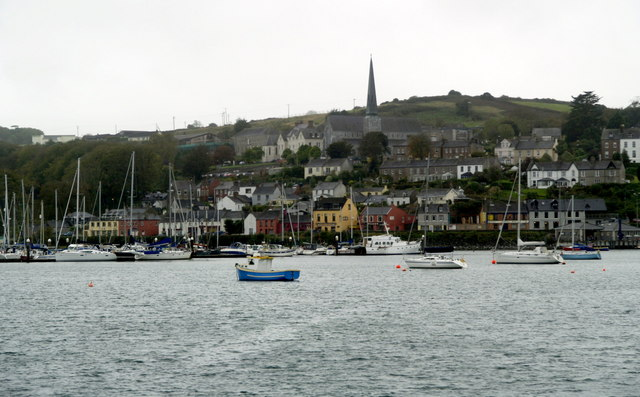
View of Crosshaven from Curraghbinny

Originally a fishing village, in the late 19th and into the 20th century, tourism became important to the town, which has 5 beaches within a 2-mile radius. The area saw an increase in 'holiday homes' in the mid-20th century, accommodating families from Cork city who stayed locally in the summer months - some of these temporary cabins were initially built using very large packing crates from the Ford factory in Cork.

Tourism attractions in the town included Piper's funfair (known as "the merries"), a nightclub called The Majorca (now closed), a cinema (also since closed), and the Cockleshell (now an arcade called La Scala). Today Crosshaven is becoming a commuter town for Ringaskiddy and Cork city.

In the 1970s and 1980s, environmental concerns came to the fore as a large industrial estate was built across the river in Ringaskiddy. It has been host Pfizer and GlaxoSmithKline and other pharmaceutical companies.

== Sport ==
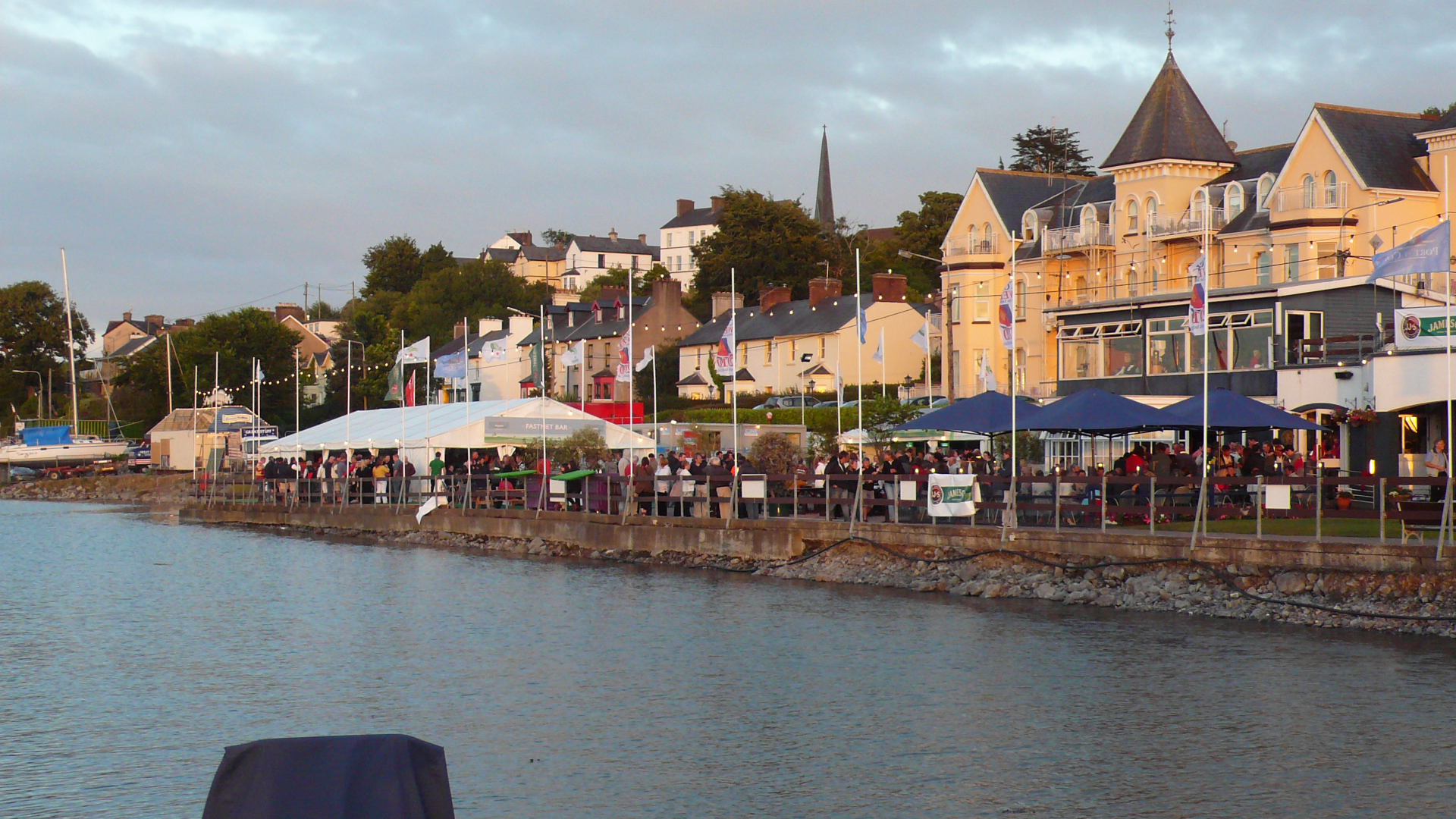
Royal Cork Yacht Club

The village is home to Royal Cork Yacht Club (RCYC) which has had its headquarters in the village since 1966. The club was established at the Cove of Cork (now Cobh) in 1720 and holds the title of the oldest in the world, according to the Guinness Book of World Records. In 1966 the RCYC merged with the Royal Munster Yacht Club and made the Royal Munster's club house its headquarters. The biennial Regatta of Cork Week (formerly Ford Cork Week due to the sponsorship of the Ford Motor Company) draws many competitors and upwards of 15 thousand spectators to each competition.

Crosshaven AFC is one of the oldest soccer clubs in Cork, and was founded in 1898. The club has two pitches, an all-weather training area and four-dressing-room clubhouse.

Crosshaven RFC (Rugby Union Football Club) was founded in 1972, and has two pitches, an all-weather pitch and a gym located at Myrtleville Cross in Crosshaven.

The local Gaelic Athletic Association club is Crosshaven GAA, which has teams playing both hurling and Gaelic football.

Crosshaven Triathlon Club meets for training on the walkway, with swimming at Myrtleville.

== Transport ==
The town is situated on the R612 regional road, and served by a single bus from Cork city centre via Carrigaline. Cork Airport is the nearest airport, and there are also ferries to France from nearby Ringaskiddy.

Crosshaven railway station was the southern terminus of the Cork, Blackrock and Passage Railway (which originally opened in 1850, but only extended south of Passage West at the start of the 20th century). The station opened on 1 June 1904, and finally closed on 1 June 1932.

== People ==
Notable residents have included the father of Bob Geldof, who was manager of the local Grand Hotel for a time, and Chelsea FC's all-time 2nd greatest scorer, Bobby Tambling.

== Sister town ==
Crosshaven has been twinned with Pleumeur-Bodou, France, since 1992.

== See also ==
- List of RNLI stations
- List of towns and villages in Ireland
