= Rochestown =

Area of Cork, Ireland

Coordinates: 51.877°N 8.39°W

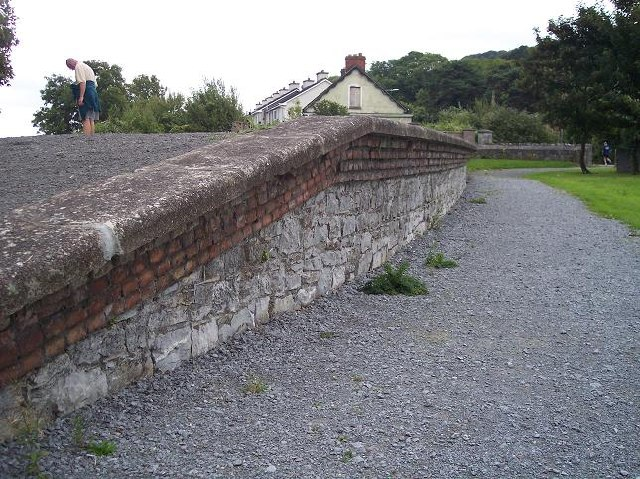
Abandoned platform of Rochestown railway station

Rochestown is a primarily residential area in Cork City, Ireland. Originally a somewhat rural area in County Cork, housing developments in the 20th and 21st centuries have connected the area to Douglas and nearby suburbs. The area was formally incorporated into Cork City following the 2019 Cork boundary change on 31 May 2019, along with the surrounding areas of Douglas, Grange and Frankfield. The R610 trunk road passes through the area, linking Rochestown and other villages in lower Cork Harbour, to the city centre. Rochestown Road also links Douglas with the N40 South Ring Road.

== History ==
Among the earliest written mentions of Rochestown are a reference in the Pipe Roll of Cloyne (1385) as "Rochestoun", and the Down Survey (1656) as "Rochtowne". Other documents record the manor and estate houses in the area, including Ronayne's Court, a fortified house which was built in 1624, and described as the "oldest house near the [River] Lee" prior to its demolition in the 20th century.

In the 19th century, the Capuchin Order opened a friary on the Rochestown-Monkstown road, which was developed as a secondary school, and is now more commonly known as St. Francis College Rochestown. Also opened in the 19th century was Rochestown railway station, a station on the Cork, Blackrock and Passage Railway line. Though closed in 1932, part of this line was developed into a walking route alongside Lough Mahon.

In the 1920s, during the Free State offensive of the Irish Civil War, there were clashes around Rochestown as Anti-Treaty irregulars attempted to hold the village from advancing Pro-Treaty National Army troops. This engagement, sometimes referred to as the "Battle of Rochestown", occurred as Emmet Dalton's National Army troops landed in numbers (with armoured car and field artillery support) at Passage West port, and advanced towards Cork city. Anti-Treaty troops, including reinforcements fresh from the Battle of Kilmallock, demolished the bridge and fortified several buildings in Rochestown, before retiring to defensive positions in Old Court Woods and Belmonte Hill. The fighting, which went on for three days, resulted in a National Army victory, and the eventual capture of Cork city. While a local Rochestown medical officer had set up a field hospital in his home, upwards of 7 Anti-Treaty and 9 Pro-Treaty soldiers were killed. Remaining Anti-Treaty prisoners were taken to Cork. One of the fiercest areas of fighting, Old Court Woods at Garryduff, is now a forested Coillte amenity.

== Amenities ==
Public green space and leisure amenities in the area include trails in Old Court woods and the Lough Mahon walkway.

The Catholic parish of Douglas and Rochestown is situated between Passage West and Douglas in County Cork. A Catholic church of this parish (St Patrick's Church) is close to the Rochestown Road.

The area is served by two schools, Scoil Phádraig Naofa (primary) which opened in 2008, and St. Francis College Rochestown (secondary) which dates to 1884.

Local businesses include a small "town centre" type development in the Mount Oval housing development.

== See also ==
- List of towns and villages in Ireland
