= Ringaskiddy =

Port village in County Cork, Ireland

Ringaskiddy Irish: Rinn an Scidígh
- Village
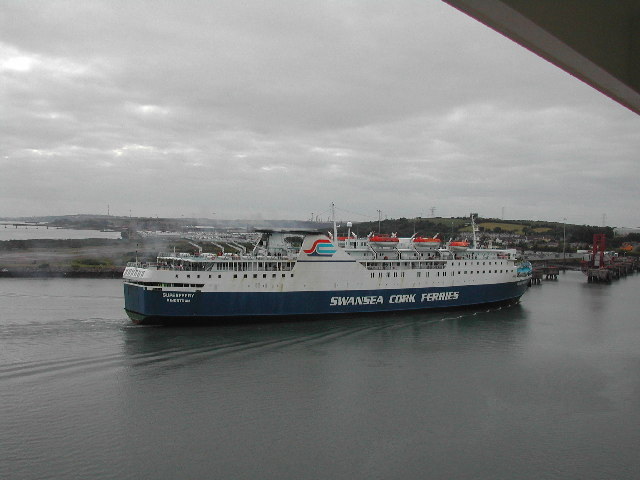
- A former Swansea–Ringaskiddy ferry in Ringaskiddy Harbour

- Location in Ireland
- Coordinates: 51°49′49″N 8°19′09″W
- Country: Ireland
- Province: Munster
- County: Cork

Population (2016)
  - Total: 580
- Time zone: UTC+0 (WET)
  - Summer (DST): UTC-1 (IST (WEST))
- Irish Grid Reference: W774642

Ringaskiddy (Irish: Rinn an Scidígh, meaning 'Skiddy's Headland') is a village in County Cork, Ireland. It is located on the western side of Cork Harbour, south of Cobh, and is 15 kilometres (9 mi) from Cork city, to which it is connected by the N28 road. The village is a port with passenger ferry, with six times weekly services to Boulogne-sur-Mer and two bi-weekly sailings to Roscoff in France. A ferry service to Swansea in Wales closed in 2012.

During the 20th century, Ringaskiddy changed from a fishing village to a centre of transport and industrial activity. It is now one of the largest employment hubs in the pharmaceuticals sector in the region. The village is close to a number of tourist areas, including Crosshaven, Curraghbinny and Monkstown. A motorway project, to connect Cork City with Ringaskiddy, was given the "green light" by the Supreme Court in March 2021.

== Places of interest ==
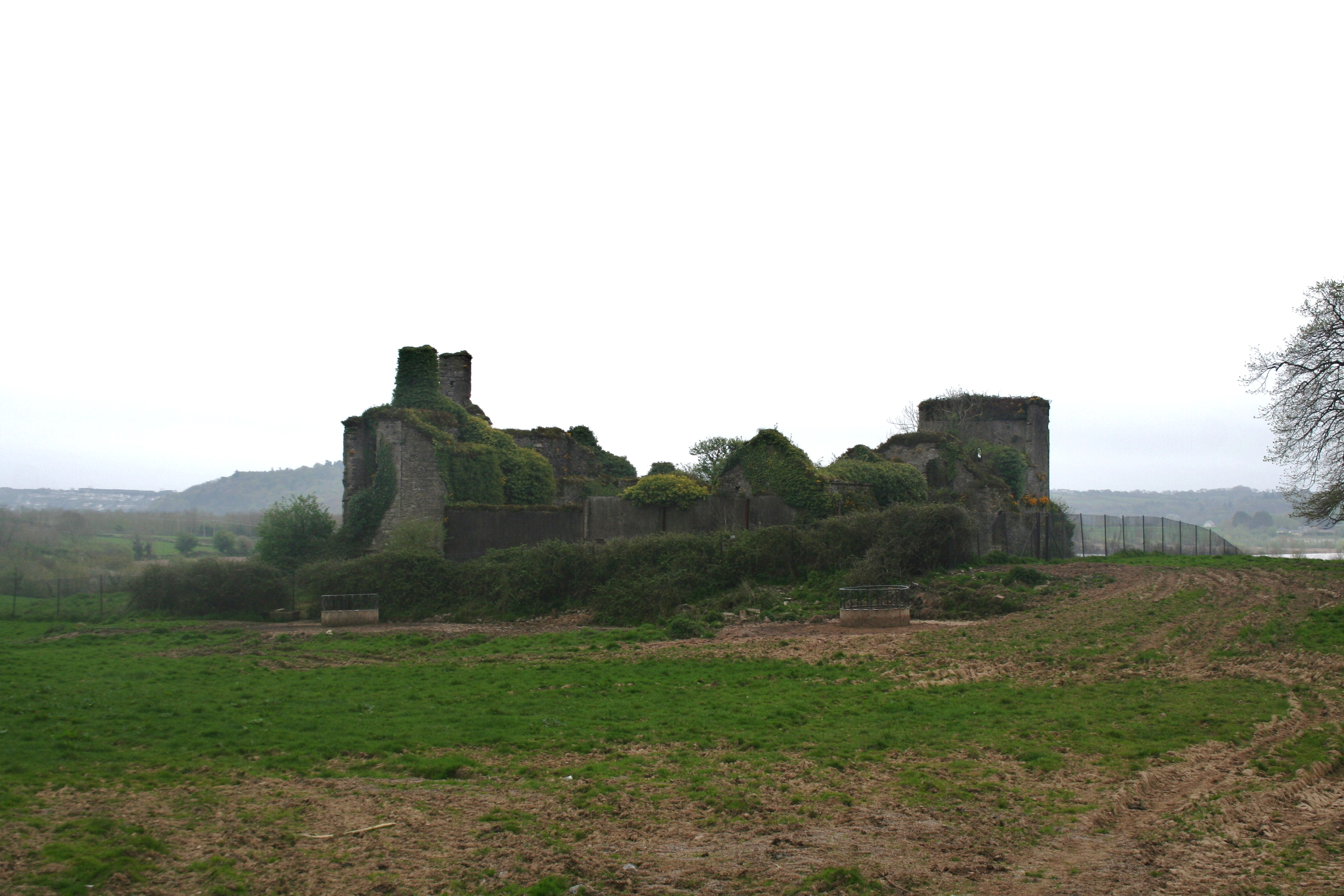
Warren's Castle near Ringaskiddy

Barnahely Castle, later known as Warren's Castle, is located near Ringaskiddy. Originally the site of an Anglo-Norman castle, a new fortification was built here during the 15th or 16th century. In 1796, the site was bought and a mansion house (incorporating the remnants of the earlier castle) was built by the Warren family. The remaining ruins of the castle include a rectangular bawn.

A Martello tower sits on a hilltop at Ringaskiddy, and is one of several other forts and towers designed to protect Cork Harbour. It is accessed via the Loughbeg road and overlooks the harbour.

There are two beaches near Ringaskiddy: Lough beach (also known locally as Luc beach) and Gobby beach. Lough beach, a sandy beach with shallow water, is served by an access path and seasonal toilet facilities. Gobby beach is a rocky beach with direct views over Spike Island.

In mid-2020, a Ringaskiddy Tidy Towns group was set up.

== Economy ==
=== Industry ===
Ringaskiddy is an important industrial centre, particularly for pharmaceutical companies such as Centocor, GlaxoSmithKline, Hovione, Novartis, Pfizer, and Recordati. Most of the world's supply of the erection-treatment drug Viagra is manufactured there. As of 2021, more than 3,800 people were reportedly employed in the Ringaskiddy area.

The Port of Cork facilities at Ringaskiddy handle much of the vehicle imports for the southern part of Ireland, with 34,000 trade vehicles imported through Cork in 2017.

=== Incinerator proposal ===
An application to build a domestic waste incinerator in Ringaskiddy was rejected by An Bord Pleanála in 2011. The incinerator's proposed owners, Indaver Ireland, said the facility would relieve pressure on landfill, while locals and environmentalists feared the incinerator would impact on public health and the environment in the area. Indaver Ireland said that they had not abandoned their plans, and in 2018 were granted planning permission for the plant. However, this decision was subject to a legal challenge and, as of 2021, the High Court was due to rule on whether An Bord Pleanála could reconsider its permission decision, or if the entire planning process had to be restarted.

== Amenities ==
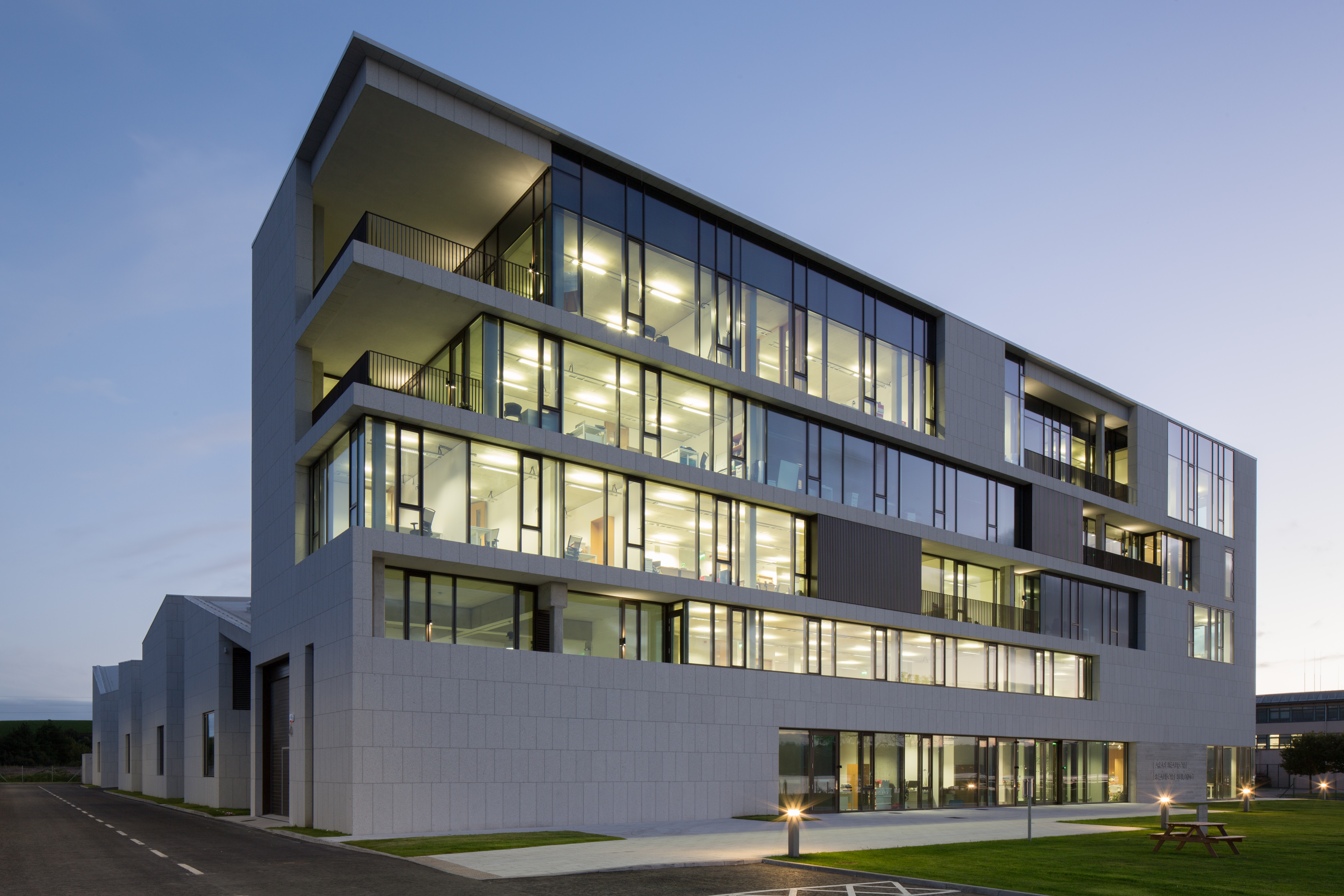
Beaufort laboratory (maritime and energy research building) on the National Maritime College campus at Ringaskiddy

Amenities in Ringaskiddy, and nearby Shanbally, include a church, primary school, shop, preschool and community centre. The local Gaelic Athletic Association club is Shanbally GAA. Ringaskiddy also has a bar/restaurant (the Ferry Boat Inn).

The National Maritime College of Ireland was officially opened in Ringaskiddy in 2006 and has drawn a student population to the village. The college provides the only training in Ireland of Merchant Navy personnel, and the Irish Naval Service also carry out their non-military training there. The Irish Naval Service base at Haulbowline is 3 kilometres (2 miles) from Ringaskiddy on the L2545 local road.

== See also ==
- List of towns and villages in Ireland
