= Monkstown, County Cork =

Village in County Cork, Ireland

Monkstown Baile an Mhanaigh
- Village
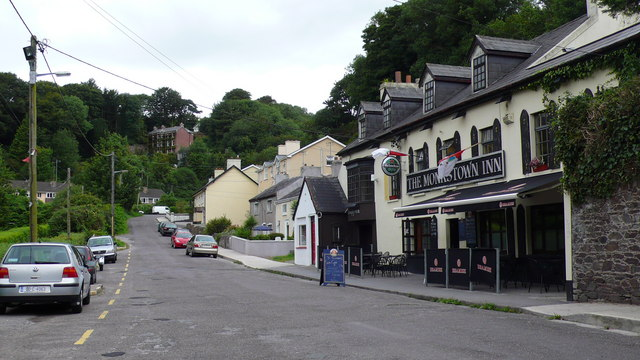
- Glen Road, Monkstown

- Location in Ireland
- Coordinates: 51°51′01″N 8°20′02″W
- Country: Ireland
- Province: Munster
- County: County Cork
- Elevation: 30 m (98 ft)
- Time zone: UTC+0 (WET)
  - Summer (DST): UTC-1 (IST (WEST))
- Irish Grid Reference: W767687

Monkstown (Irish: Baile an Mhanaigh - 'the town of the monk', formerly anglicised as Ballinvannegh) is a village in County Cork, Ireland, in the old barony of Kerrycurrihy. It lies 14 kilometres southeast of Cork city on the estuary of the River Lee, facing Great Island and looking onto Monkstown Bay. For census purposes, Monkstown is combined with the nearby town of Passage West, and the combined area had a population of approximately 6,000 residents at the 2022 census. The village is in a townland and civil parish of the same name. The Catholic parish of Monkstown includes the nearby villages of Shanbally and Ringaskiddy.

== History and name ==
The name of the village is said to derive from an early monastic site near where Monkstown Castle now stands. Although no archaeological evidence remains for the monastery, the site of the monastery's abbey is referenced (as Legan Abbey) in 19th century maps and works. Over time, the name Baile an Mhanaigh/Monkstown overtook the old name Baile an Fealach (Foley's homestead), although the latter name persists in the name of a townland of the village: Ballyfouloo.

== Monkstown Castle ==
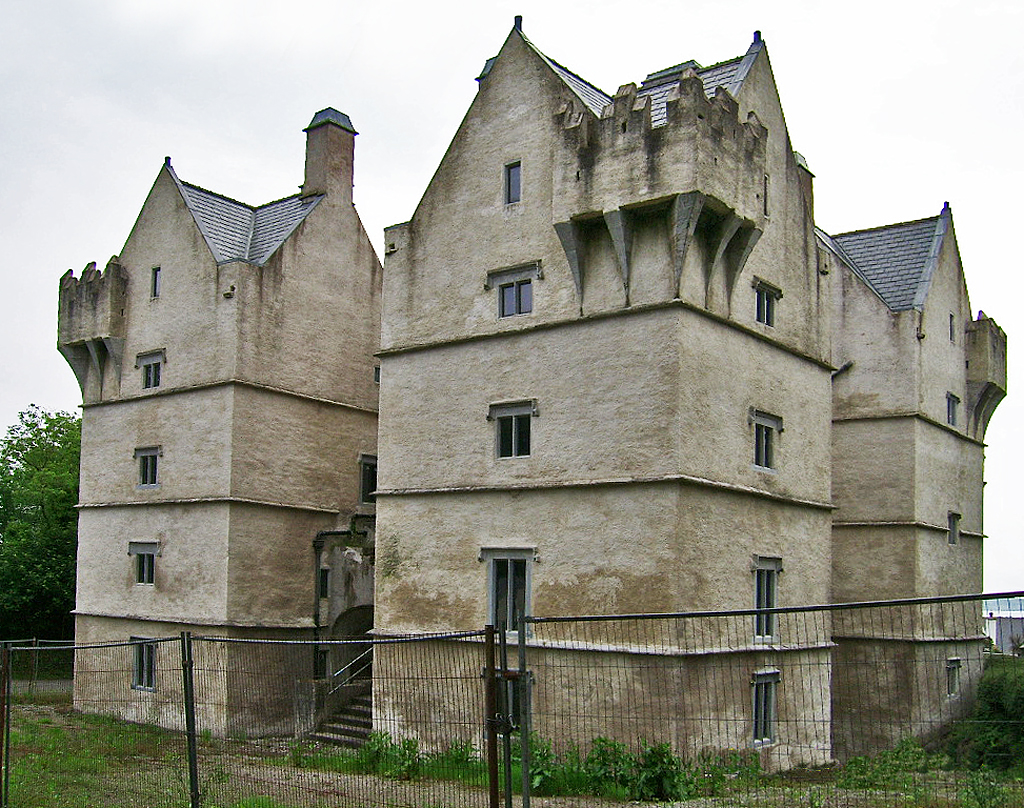
Monkstown Castle

Monkstown Castle is a fortified tower house that was constructed around 1636 by Anastasia Archdeacon, reputedly as a surprise gift for her husband John. He had been fighting with the Spanish Catholics in the continental wars of the time. As implausible legend has it that, when John Archdeacon's ship entered Monkstown bay, a cannonball was fired at the castle, as it was believed to have been built by an occupying force. Anastasia Archdeacon hired workers to come to Monkstown to build the castle. She housed the workers (in accommodation built specially for them), and fed and clothed them (for a price). Once the workers had settled up their bills with her, it is said that the overall cost of the castle worked out at about four pence.

The castle was, over the centuries, owed or occupied by Cromwellian soldier Thomas Plunkett, Archbishop of Armagh Michael Boyle, and the Bernard Shaw family. Later used as a clubhouse for the nearby Monkstown Golf Club, the castle was seriously damaged by fire in the 1970s. The castle has since been partially renovated and, as of 2021, was on the market for sale.

== See also ==
- List of towns and villages in Ireland
