= N27 road (Ireland) =

National primary road in Ireland

N27 road
- Bóthar N27
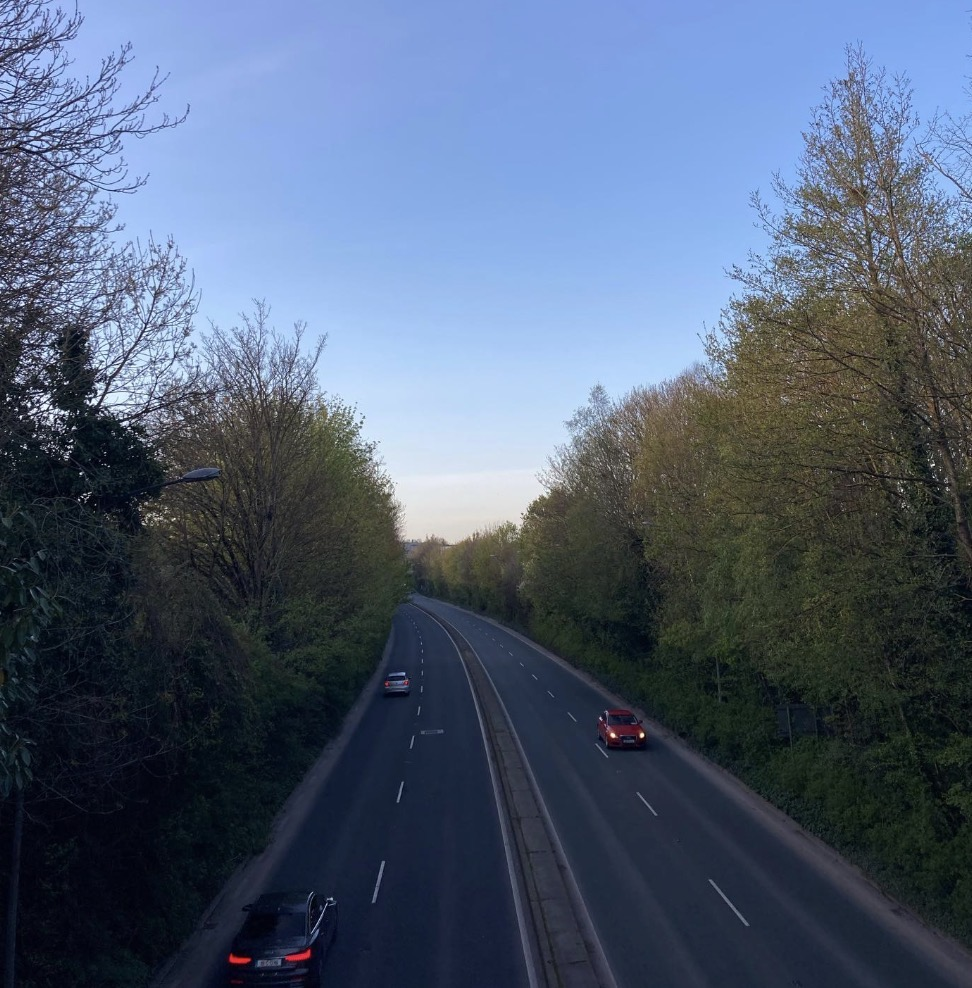
- South City Link Road section of the N27.

Route information
- Length: 6.30 km (3.91 mi)

Location
- Country: Ireland
- Primary destinations: Cork City; City Centre; Cork Airport; County Cork; Kinsale (R600)

Highway system
- Roads in Ireland; Motorways; Primary; Secondary; Regional

The N27 road is a national primary road in Cork city, Ireland. The road forms a route from the city centre to Cork Airport, and onto the R600 connecting to the port town of Kinsale.

The route runs out of the city centre along the following route: Michael Collins Bridge, Custom House Street, Éamon De Valera Bridge, Albert Street and Old Market Road. The bridges are across the two diverged parts of the River Lee which flow around the city centre. The South Link Road was opened to traffic in May 1985. By the mid 1990s, the road surface of the South Link Road had fallen into a state of disrepair. Between 1998 and 1999, a new road surface was laid down along the entire distance of this route. The South Link Road brings the N27 from the city centre area out to the N40 Cork South Ring Road at the Kinsale Road Roundabout, a three lane signal-controlled non-symmetrical roundabout (with 5 exits) that has been upgraded to a grade-separated interchange in relatively recent times, and referred to as the Magic Roundabout. The southern exit of this roundabout is the Kinsale Road, or Airport Road, and carries the N27 out to the airport. The section of the N27 between the Kinsale Road Roundabout and Farmer's Cross was improved during the mid to late 1990s. In 2005, this route section received further improvements. The route terminates at the Airport Road Roundabout. The western exit at this roundabout is the only main access into the airport itself. There are now plans to construct a secondary access route to Cork Airport.

== See also ==
- Roads in Ireland
- Motorways in Ireland
- National secondary road
- Regional road
