= National primary road =

Major road in Ireland

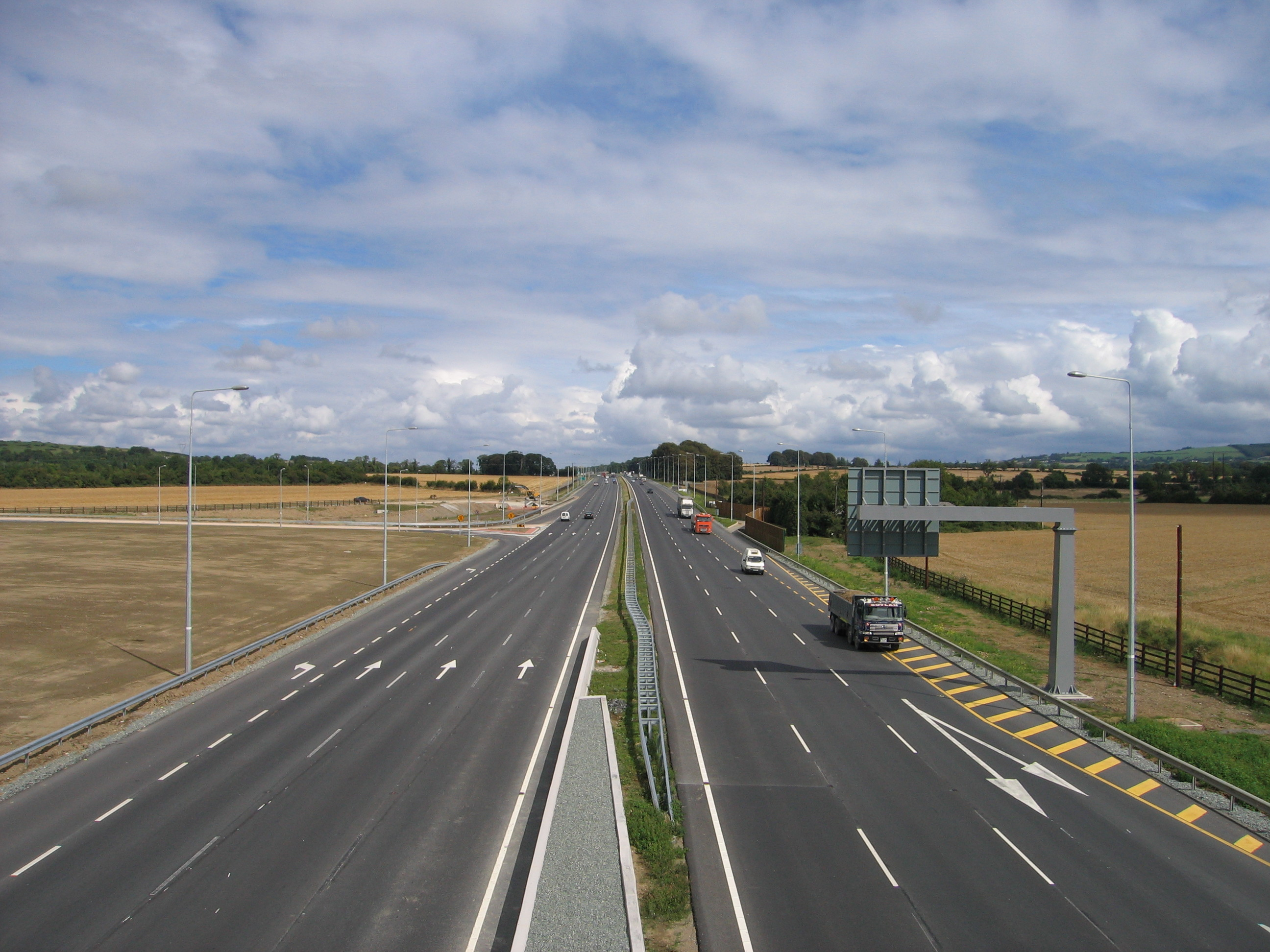
Naas Road (N7), non-Motorway high-grade dual carriageway.

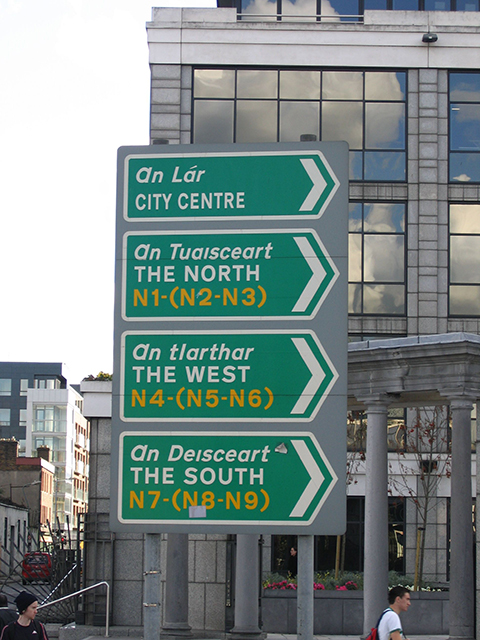
Sign in Dublin indicating the principal national primary roads fanning out from the capital city.

A national primary road (Irish: príomhbhóthar náisiúnta) is a road classification in Ireland. National primary roads form the major routes between the major urban centres. There are 2649 km of national primary roads. This category of road has the prefix "N" followed by one or two digits. Motorways are prefixed "M" followed by one or two digits.

== Description ==
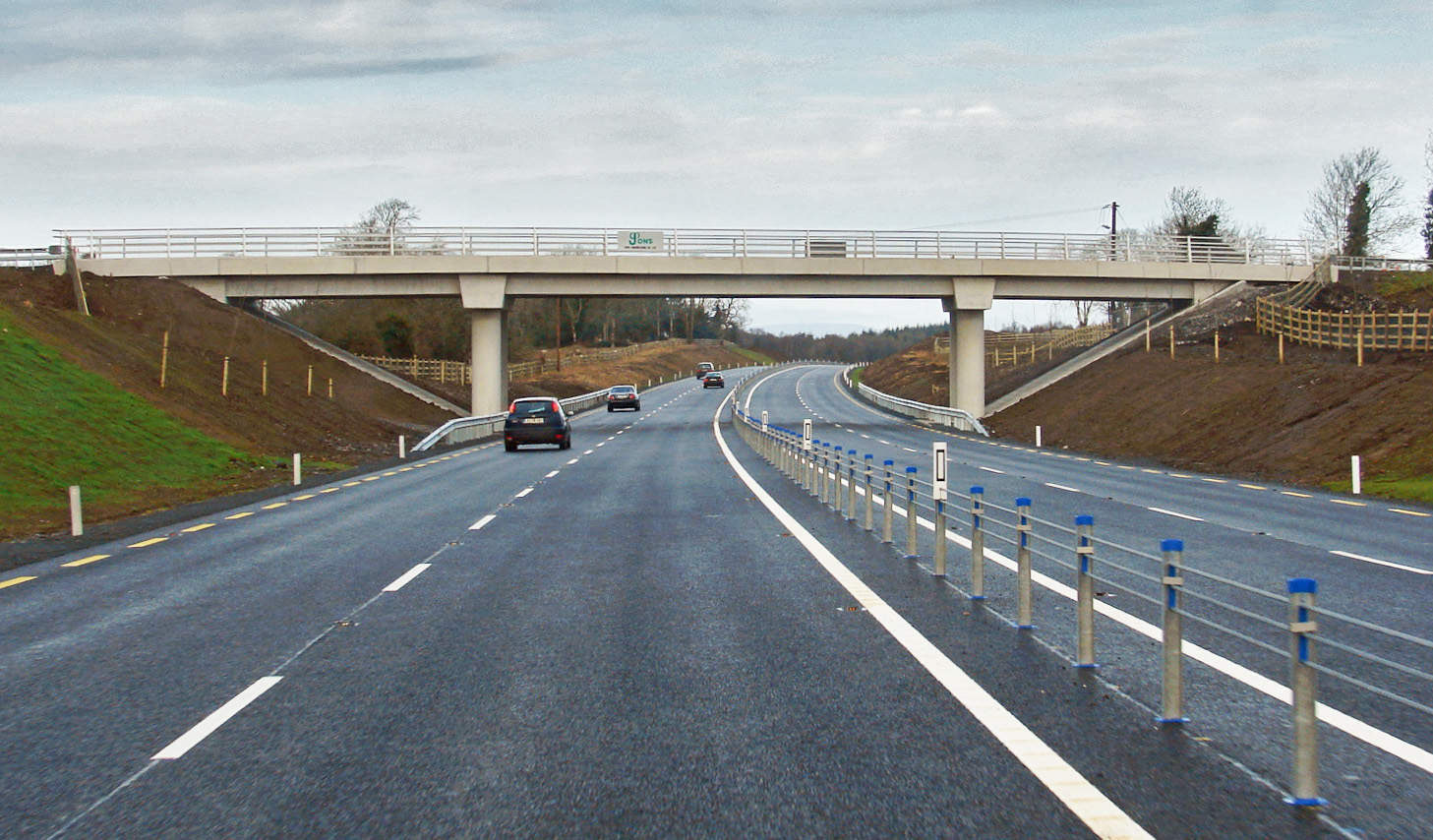
2+2 section of the N4 (Dromod-Roosky bypass) in County Leitrim.

The routes numbered N1–N11 radiate anti-clockwise from Dublin, with those in the range N12–N26 being cross-country roads. Routes numbered N27–N33 are much shorter roads than the majority of the network: they link major pieces of infrastructure (such as ports and airports) to the network, such as the N33 being a feeder route to a major motorway (the M1). Finally, the N40 and the M50 are bypass roads of Ireland's two largest cities, Cork and Dublin. National secondary roads are numbered under the same scheme with higher numbers (from N51 on). On road signage, destinations served but not on the route in question are listed in brackets, with the connecting route also listed (see thumbnail). Directional road signs on national primary roads are usually in white text on a green background, with the road number in yellow. Signs for roads of a different standard are shown using appropriately coloured patches according to a system derived from the UK's Guildford Rules.

Most national primary roads are of at least wide two lanes standard, with sections within Greater Dublin and near the regional cities typically being at least dual-carriageway standard. There are however some narrow two-lane sections remaining.

Northern Ireland route sections (which are classified separately according to NI schemes) are in some cases included in a theoretical complete cross-border route – for example, the N3 route, which re-enters the Republic. These are listed here in brackets for completeness (and are present on road signage within the Republic).

Sections of some national primary roads form part of the European route network. Sections of the N25, N11 and N1 roads form the Republic of Ireland part of route E1 (or E01); sections of the N7, N18 and N19 roads form part of route E20; the N8 forms part of route E201 and sections of the N25 form part of route E30. E-route marker signs are placed on some route confirmation signs on certain sections of these roads.

== History ==
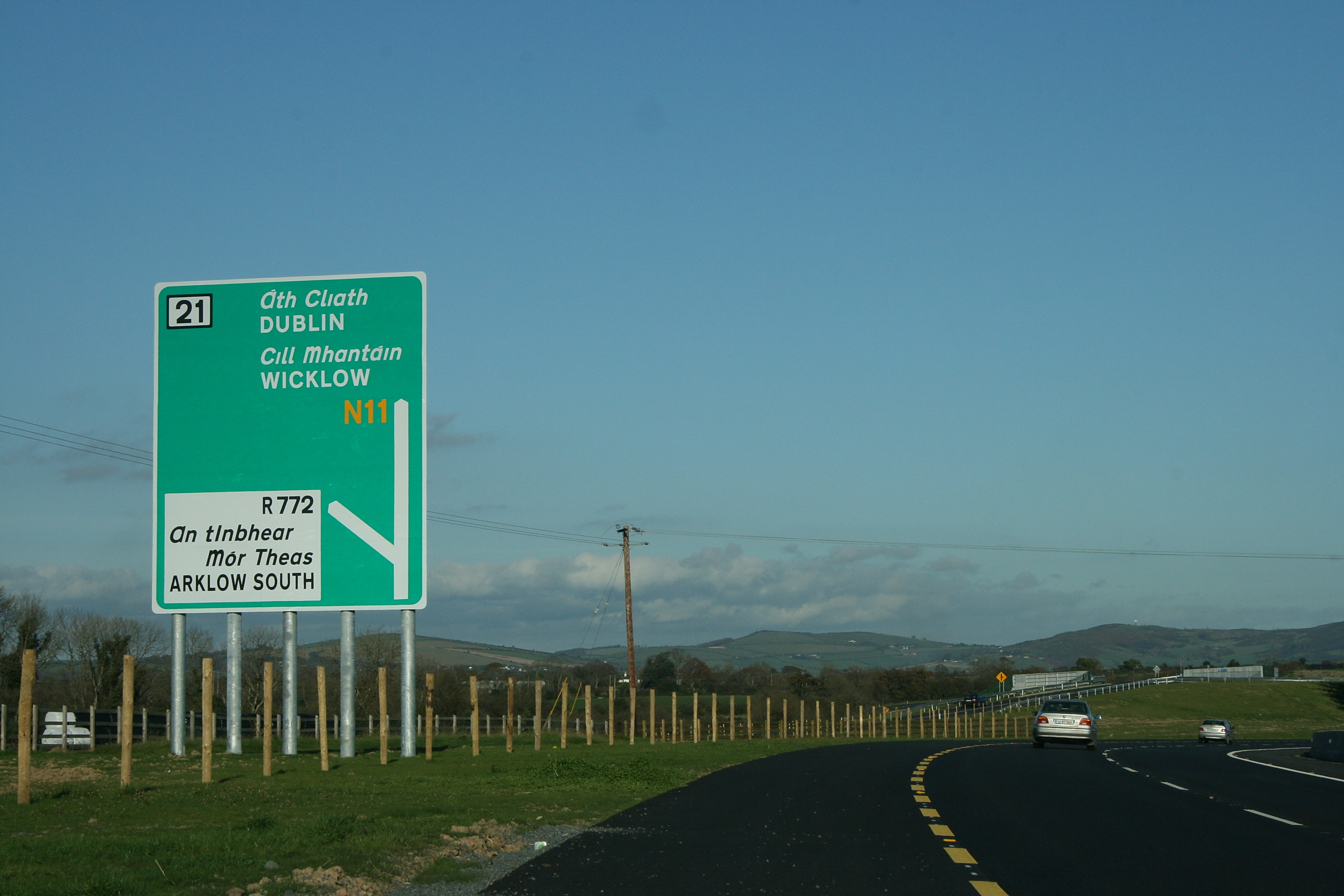
N11 Exit sign. This route has since been upgraded to motorway status

From the 1920s through to 1977, Irish roads had been numbered under a system of Trunk Roads and link roads (see Trunk roads in Ireland for details). The introduction of a National Route numbering system had been discussed since the late 1960s. Legislation to allow its introduction was passed in 1974: the Local Government (Roads and Motorways) Act 1974, which introduced the concepts of motorways and national roads into Irish law. The routes of the original 25 national primary roads were defined via Statutory Instrument (the Local Government (Roads and Motorways) Act, 1974 (Declaration of National Roads) Order, 1977) in 1977 and the new numbers began to appear on road signs shortly thereafter, with the N4 road and N6 road the first to be signed. The first motorway, the M7 Naas bypass, opened in 1983.

Since the introduction of the National Route numbering system, the system has remained relatively unchanged in its overall design, although as new bypasses open the various routes themselves have undergone changes. The legislative basis for the system changed in 1993 with the Roads Act 1993. This act introduced a major change: a new body, the National Roads Authority (NRA), since replaced by Transport Infrastructure Ireland (TII), was set up to manage the national road network. It also made motorways integral parts of national routes (previously they had been a separate classification) and introduced the new classifications of Regional road and local road. In 1994, three national secondary roads (N57, N64, N79) were reclassified as national primary roads and subsequently renumbered (N57 to N26, N64 to part N18, N79 to N30). Section of the N60 between Castlebar and Westport in County Mayo was reclassified as the N5. Four other national primary routes (N27, N28, N29, N31) were added to the network: a section of the R600 regional road between Cork city centre and Cork Airport was reclassified as the N27, the N28 was partly newly constructed and partly a reclassified section of regional road (R609), the N29 was newly constructed and the N31 was made up of roads previously classified as regional roads.

The N32, which had been constructed from new as an extension of the M50 Northern Cross Route project became part of the system in 1996. The N32 was reclassified as the R139 regional road in 2013. The N33 also became part of the system in the late 1990s, although it was only defined in the 2006 definition of the state's national roads, the Roads Act 1993 (Classification of National Roads) Order 2006. In 2012, the N40 was created which completely encompasses the Cork South Ring Road. Parts of the N22 and N25 were reclassified to create this road. To date, it remains the newest national primary road. Route numbers N34 to N49 (excluding N40) remain unallocated.

== Upgrades to motorway status and high-quality dual carriageways ==
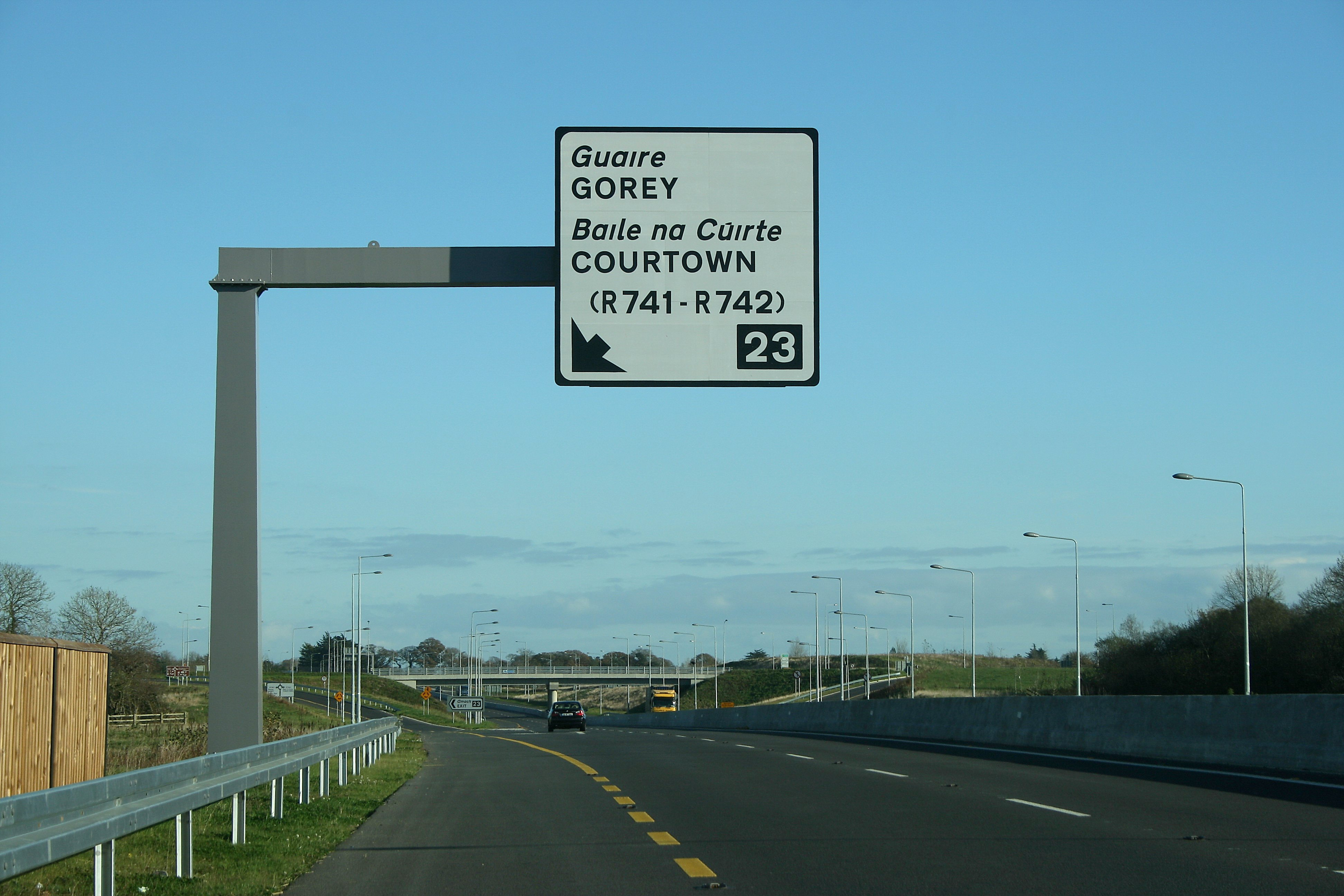
N11 Junction 23; new standard exit sign for restricted access roads in Ireland. This route has since been reclassified as a motorway

Under the National Development Plan, the major national primary roads – the N1 from Dublin to Dundalk (and towards Belfast), N6 (along with that section of the N4 leading to it) Dublin to Galway, N7 Dublin to Limerick, N8 Portlaoise to Cork, and N9 Dublin to Waterford were upgraded to motorway or high-quality dual-carriageway standard. These roads have at least two lanes in each direction, an unbroken central median, and access only at special interchanges. In addition, motorways have a set of regulations limiting access to certain types of motor vehicle traffic and other special rules, including higher speed limits of 120 km/h. Upgrades to the specified roads were completed in 2010. In addition, a new motorway – the M50 – was built around Dublin. Where a section of a national primary road is designated as a motorway, signage is white-on-blue instead of white-on-green, in addition, the prefix "N" is dropped, and replaced with "M" instead on road signs. A high-quality dual carriageway may be redesignated as a motorway by means of an order under the Roads Act 2007.

In addition to the major interurbans, the N11, N17, N18, N20, N21, and N25 – all of which form links between regional cities or other strategic links – also have major sections of good standard dual carriageway (in the N18's case, the entire route is made up of dual carriageway and motorway since 2017), with some sections of motorway also in place. Current plans are to substantially replace the existing N20 with a motorway (the M20).

Based on the combined lengths of existing roads, current construction and proposed future construction, it is probable that over 50% of the national primary road network will be either motorway, high-quality dual carriageway or 2+2 dual-carriageway by 2030. Approximately 38.5% (1,105 km) of the network may be motorways.

== List of national primary roads ==
This list of national primary roads, and their descriptions, is based on the Roads Act 1993 (Classification of National Roads) Order 2015. The road lengths are from National Route Lengths as of 31/12/2015 published by TII and are accurate to the end of 2015. Most lengths have been rounded slightly.

National primary roads in Ireland
Road name	Description	Length (km)	Length (mi)
N1	Dublin – Border (North of Dundalk) – (A1 Newry – Belfast)	89.91	55.87
N2	Dublin – Monaghan – (A5 Omagh – Derry)	133.01	82.65
N3	Dublin – Cavan – Ballyshannon	127.39	79.16
N4	Dublin – Sligo	198.21	123.16
N5	(N4 from Dublin) – Longford – Castlebar – Westport	131.39	81.64
N6	(N4 from Dublin) – Kinnegad – Galway	147.99	91.96
N7	Dublin – Limerick	186.89	116.13
N8	(N7 from Dublin) – Portlaoise – Cork	147.39	91.58
N9	(N7 from Dublin) – Newbridge – Carlow – Waterford	119.09	74.00
N10	Clifden – Kilkenny – Danesfort	17.14	10.65
N11	Dublin – Wexford	129.07	80.20
N12	Monaghan – Border (Ardgonnell Bridge) – (A3 to Belfast)	6.87	4.27
N13	(N15 from Sligo) – Stranorlar – Letterkenny – (A2 to Derry, A6, M22, M2 to Belfast)	43.76	27.19
N14	Letterkenny – Lifford – (A38 to Strabane)	17.48	10.86
N15	Sligo – Donegal – Lifford – (A38, A5 to Derry)	110.99	68.97
N16	Sligo – (A4 to Enniskillen, A4, M1 to Belfast)	47.49	29.51
N17	(M18, M6 from Athenry) - Tuam – Claremorris – Collooney – (N4 to Sligo)	122.85	76.34
N18	(M6, M17 from Athenry) Gort – Ennis – Limerick	98.47	61.19
N19	(N18 from Limerick and M18 from Ennis and Galway) – Shannon Town – Shannon Airport	3.45	2.14
N20	Limerick – Cork	96.45	59.93
N21	Limerick – Castleisland – Tralee (to N22/N69 Tralee Bypass)	84.37	52.43
N22	Cork – Killarney – Farranfore – Tralee (to N22/N69 Tralee Bypass)	116.33	72.28
N23	(N21 from Limerick) – Castleisland – Farranfore – (N22 to Killarney)	9.509	5.909
N24	Limerick – Waterford	116.13	72.16
N25	Cork – Waterford – Rosslare Europort	188.05	116.85
N26	(N4, N5 from Dublin) – Swinford – Ballina	29.79	18.51
N27	Cork city centre – Cork Airport	6.30	3.91
N28	Cork – Ringaskiddy	11.25	6.99
N29	Belview Port Access	3.55	2.21
N30	(N25 from Cork, Waterford near New Ross) – Enniscorthy – (N11 to Dublin)	33.17	20.61
N31	M50 (junction 14) – Leopardstown Rd – Brewery Rd – (N11 at Stillorgan) – Dún Laoghaire harbour	7.11	4.42
N33	Charleville – Ardee	7.59	4.72
N40	Cork South Ring Road	15.45	9.60
N50	M50/Dublin western bypass: East Wall – (M1 to Dublin and Belfast) – Turnapin – Palmerston – Redcow – Shankill (N11 to Wexford).	45.55	28.30
Total length of network:		2,649	1,646

=== Defunct route ===
- N32: Turnapin to Darndale, Dublin; downgraded to a section of the R139 in 2012.

== See also ==
- Roads in Ireland
- Motorways in the Republic of Ireland
- National secondary road
