= N8 road (Ireland) =

Road in trans-European E-road network

N8 road
- Bóthar N8

Route information
- Part of E201
- Length: 177 km (110 mi)

Location
- Country: Ireland
- Primary destinations: (bypassed routes in italics): County Laois; Abbeyleix; Durrow (N77); Cullohill; County Kilkenny; Johnstown; Urlingford; County Tipperary; (N75 to Thurles); Littleton; Horse and Jockey; (N62 from Thurles); Cashel, (N74 to Tipperary Town); New Inn; Cahir (N24); County Limerick; Kilbeheny; County Cork; Mitchelstown (N73); Fermoy; Rathcormack; Watergrasshill; Cork City; Sallybrook; Glanmire; City Centre

Highway system
- Roads in Ireland; Motorways; Primary; Secondary; Regional

The N8 road is a national primary road in Ireland, connecting Cork with Dublin via the M7. The N8 is further classified by the United Nations as the entirety of the (partially signed) European route E 201 (formerly E200), part of the trans-Europe International E-road network. The road is motorway standard from junction 19 on the M7 to the Dunkettle interchange in Cork City and is designated as the M8 motorway. From here the route continues into Cork city centre and terminates at the N22 road at St. Patrick's Street. The M8 motorway was completed in May 2010, replacing the single carriageway sections of the old N8 and bypassing towns on the main Cork to Dublin road. It is now possible to travel from Cork to Dublin on the M/N8 in about 2 hours 30 minutes. The route commences just south of Portlaoise, and reaches Cork via the midlands and the Golden Vale, through counties Laois, Kilkenny, Tipperary, Limerick and Cork.

== Route from County Laois to Cork City ==
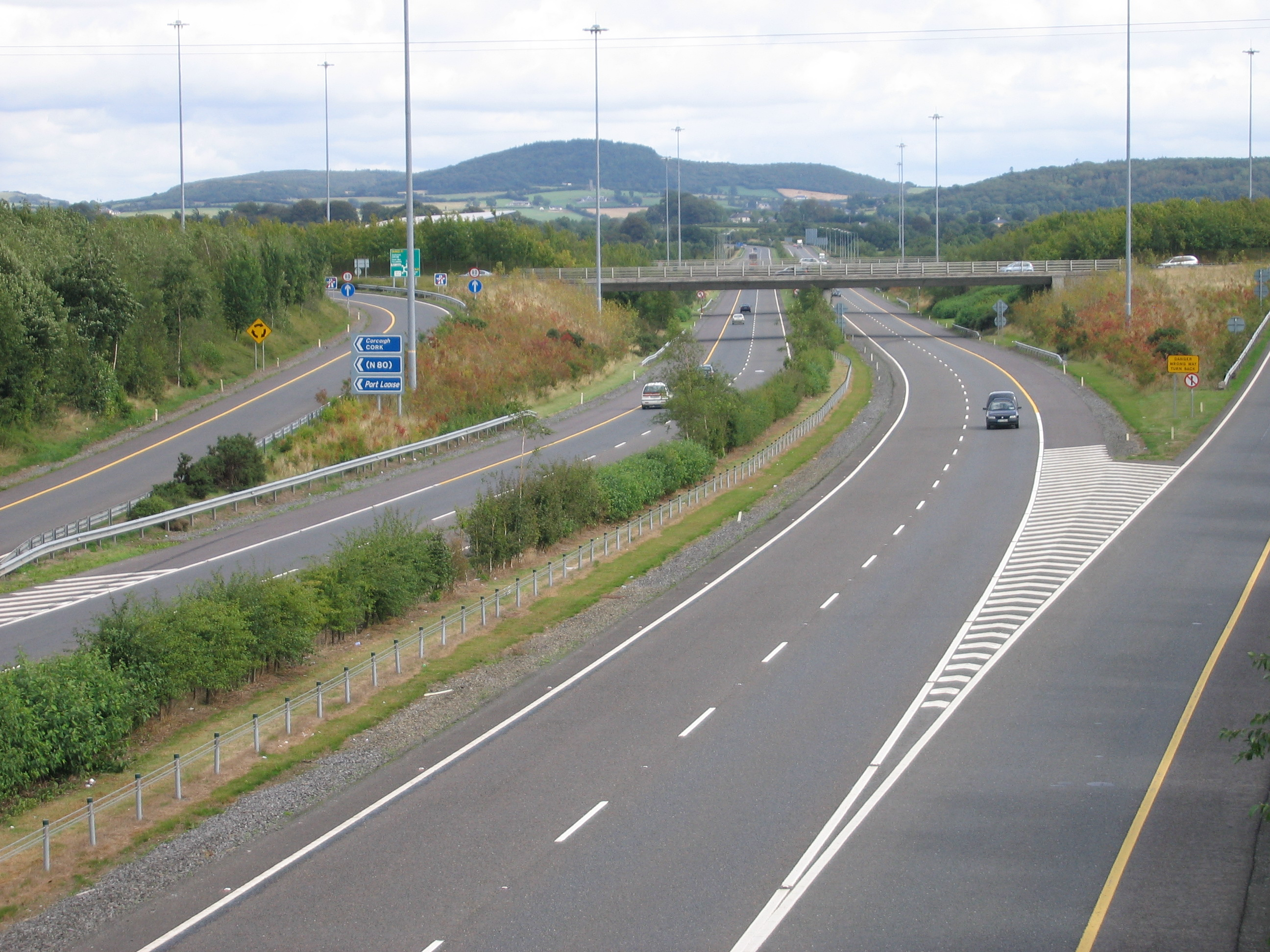
J17 on M7; the start/end point of the N77. This was the start point of the old N8 single carriageway. The M8 now begins at junction 19 further west of Portlaoise following the opening of the M7/M8 in May 2010

Junction 19 on the N7 route (M7 motorway from Naas to past Portlaoise) at Aghaboe marks the start of the N8 (see thumbnails). From here it proceeds southwards, passing under the R434 and R433 roads until it runs parallel to the single-carriageway R639 road, bypassing Abbeyleix, Durrow, Cullahill, Johnstown, Urlingford, Littleton, Horse and Jockey, Cashel, New Inn, Cahir, Skeheenarinky, Kilbeheny, Mitchelstown, Kilworth Mountain, Fermoy, Rathcormac, Watergrasshill and Glanmire. Originally the N8 route passed through all of these towns as a single carriageway however a series of projects as part of the transport 21 road infrastructural project saw all of these towns bypassed and the route replaced with motorway. The M8 motorway ends at the Dunkettle interchange however the N8 route continues into Cork city centre as the Lower Glanmire Road, Water Street, Horgan's Quay, Penrose Quay, Brian Boru Bridge and Merchant's Quay (and the route returns via St. Patrick's Bridge, Bridge Street and McCurtain Street). The N8 ends where it meets the N22 at St. Patrick's Street. Following completion of the M8 the old N8 has been redesignated as the N77 from Durrow to Portlaoise, with other sections redesignated as the R639.

== Map of route ==
- Route of N8 overlaid on Google Maps

== History of the Dublin to Cork road ==
=== 18th and 19th centuries ===
In the 17th, 18th, and early- to mid-19th centuries, and probably earlier still, horse-drawn Dublin-Cork traffic travelled via Kilcullen, Carlow, Kilkenny, Clonmel, Ardfinnan, Clogheen, Ballyporeen, Kilworth, Fermoy and Rathcormac. Much of the N8/R639 route was built to connect the midlands to southern Tipperary and north County Cork as part of the Irish turnpike road-building drive of the mid-18th century. However, some sections are much older, such as the segments between Cork and Fermoy, Cashel and Cahir and Durrow to Abbeyleix; the construction of these particular stretches cannot as yet be dated, though they were in place prior to 1714. The N8/R639 between Fermoy and Cahir via Mitchelstown was built sometime after 1811, while the R639/former N8 between Cashel and Urlingford was built around 1739. At the same time, the route from Urlingford to Maryboro (modern-day Portlaoise) was substantially improved. In 1782 an unnamed English tourist in Ireland, known to historians as "X.Z.", gave a brief description of the route between Cashel and Urlingford: "From Cashel we rode fifteen miles of a bad road, through a bleak country to Urlingford, when we enter Leinster province. The country now becomes more populous, better improved, and the roads much more agreeable for travelling."

=== 20th and 21st centuries ===
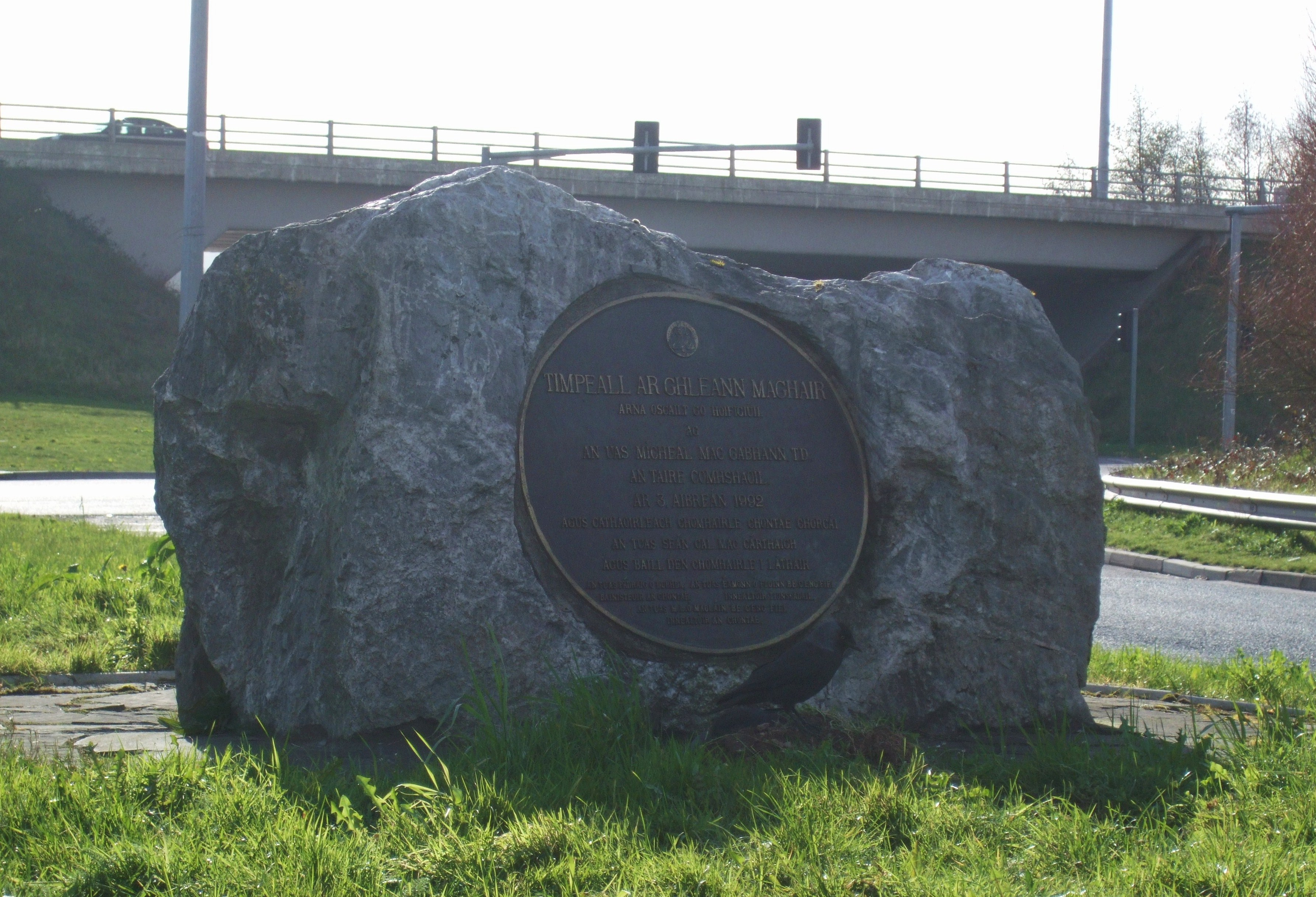
Commemorative plaque marking the opening of the Glanmire Bypass in 1992, located at the Dunkettle Interchange, Cork.

Some time after 1811 the gaps in the R639 between Fermoy and Cahir were filled, but the traditional route, known for much of the 20th century as the T6, continued to run from Cahir to Dublin via Clonmel, Kilkenny and Carlow. The R639/N8 corridor did not become the official Dublin to Cork road until 1974 when it was designated as the N8, though several Esso road atlases considered it to be the preferred route for motorists travelling between the two cities from at least the early 1960s.

The N8 was improved at various times during the 1970s through to the early years of the 21st century. Improvement projects carried out on the road during the 1970s, 1980s and 1990s involved periodic widening, resurfacing and the replacement of signposts. The first major improvement work carried out on the N8, post designation, involved the construction of a 4 km single carriageway bypass south-west of Cahir in County Tipperary. This opened to traffic in 1991, and remained the N8 until the M8 motorway was completed through South Tipperary on 25 July 2008.

The 1991 N8 Cahir Bypass was then renumbered as part of the N24, and was simultaneously designated as the R639. (The original route of the N8 through Cahir town was redesignated a regional road in 1991, and was renumbered as part of the R670).

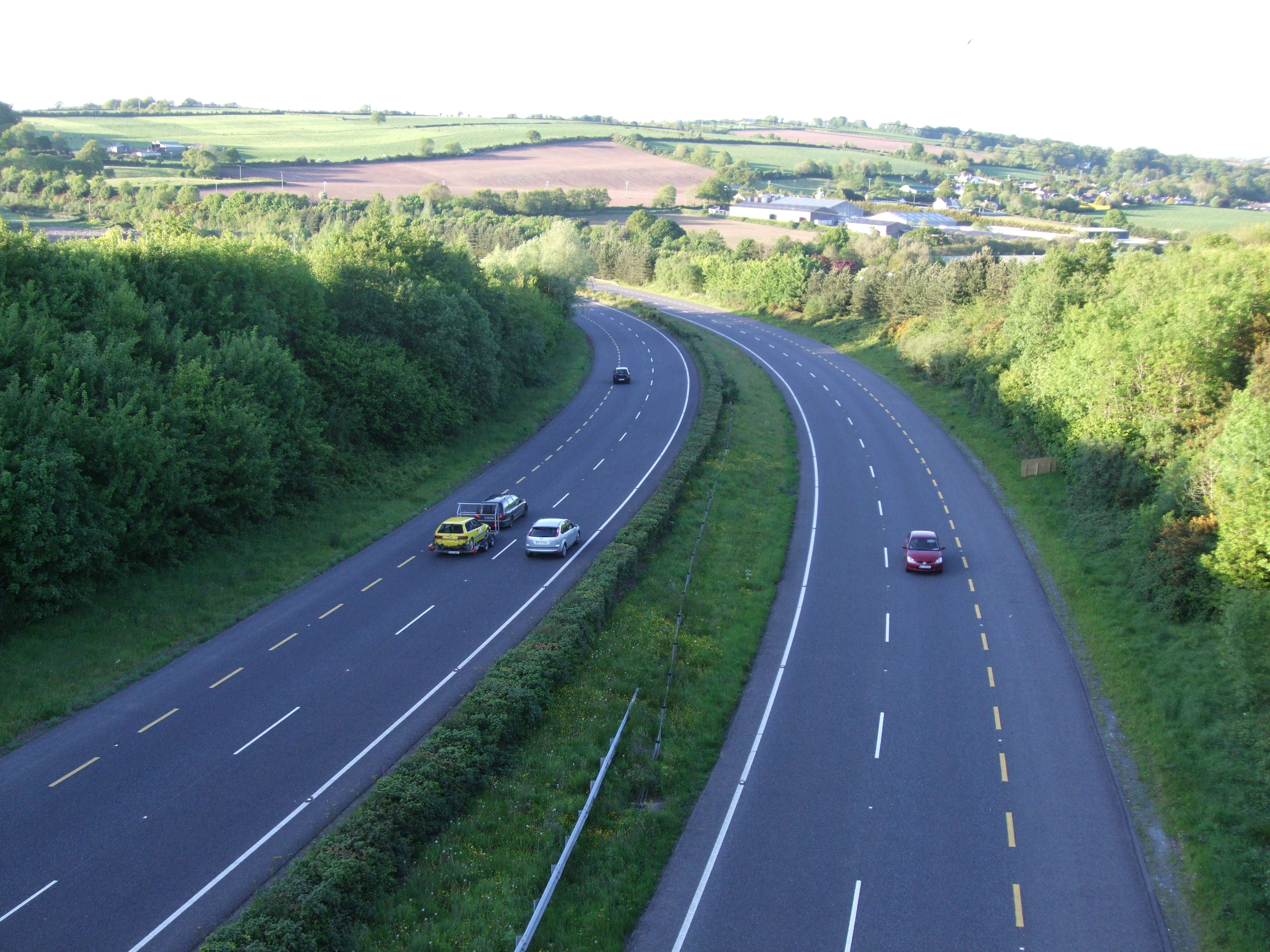
This section of the N8, known as the Glanmire bypass, marks the entrance to Cork City. It was given motorway status and became a part of the M8 on 28 August 2009.

The next major improvement entailed a realignment of the road so that it bypassed the village of Glanmire for 6 km to the east. This dual carriageway bypass, referred to in official documentation as the "Glanmire Bypass", cost £35 million and opened on 3 April 1992 after a construction period of almost seven years. In spring 2001, attention was turned to Watergrasshill in County Cork. For many years regarded as a serious bottleneck on the N8, a wide median 7 km dual carriageway bypass was constructed and opened to traffic in September 2003 as the N8, with the former road through Watergrasshill becoming the R639. In 2004, the N8 through Cashel in County Tipperary was realigned with a narrow-median dual carriageway bypass to the east of that town. Again, the former N8 through Cashel was redesignated a regional road, and renumbered the R639. In July 2006, a circuitous and oft-criticized single carriageway relief road for Mitchelstown was opened to traffic around the west of the town. Ultimately, the N8 Cashel bypass was itself reclassified as part of the M8 motorway in July 2008. The changes took effect on 24 September 2008. Shortly prior to this, in October 2007, the section of N8 between Cashel and Cahir was bypassed by an early-opening segment of the now M8 motorway between junctions 9 and 10 and, for a 10-month period, this 13 km section of high-quality dual carriageway was designated a section of the N8 (the former single carriageway became the R639). On 25 July 2008 the section of single carriageway N8 between Cahir and Kilbehenny was also superseded by the new motorway, and this too was renumbered as the R639. This, in turn, was followed on 8 December 2008 by the length of road from Cashel to 2 km south of Cullahill in County Laois. In the meantime, the Watergrasshill to Fermoy section of the M8 had opened in October 2006.

The Fermoy to Mitchelstown section of the M8 opened on 25 May 2009. The former single carriageway N8 that ran between these towns was then reclassified, for the most part, as the R639 except for a section of the Mitchelstown Relief Road which became a part of the N73 national secondary route.

=== Summary of major route improvements ===
Year Opened	From	To	Current Designation and Notes
1991	Cahir	(n/a)	N24 & R639. Single carriageway bypass of Cahir. No longer part of route.
1992	Dunkettle	north of Sallybrook	N8. Dual carriageway bypass of Glanmire and Sallybrook. Redesignation to M8 on 28 August 2009.
2003	north of Sallybrook	north of Watergrasshill	N8. Dual carriageway bypass of Watergrasshill. Redesignation to M8 on 28 August 2009.
2004	Cashel	(n/a)	M8. Bypass of Cashel. Originally designated N8 and opened as dual carriageway.
2006	Mitchelstown	(n/a)	N73 and R639. No longer part of route.
2006	north of Watergrasshill	north of Fermoy	M8. Motorway from north of Watergrasshill to north of Fermoy.
2007	Cashel	Cahir	M8. Motorway between Cashel and Cahir. Originally designated N8 and opened as dual carriageway.
2008	north-east of Mitchelstown	Cahir	M8. Motorway from near Mitchelstown to Cahir. Originally designated N8 and opened as dual carriageway.
2008	Cashel	Cullahill	M8. Motorway from Cashel to Cullahill.
2009	north-east of Mitchelstown	north of Fermoy	M8. Motorway from north of Mitchelstown to north of Fermoy.
2010	Cullahill	Aghaboe (Portlaoise) (Connects to M7 at junction 19)	M8. Completion of M7/M8 between Dublin and Cork. Tolled Section

== See also ==
- M8 motorway (Ireland)
- Roads in Ireland
- Motorways in the Republic of Ireland
- National secondary road
- Regional road
- History of roads in Ireland
- Trunk roads in Ireland
- Jack Lynch Tunnel
- Transport Infrastructure Ireland
