= Mitchelstown =

Town in County Cork, Ireland

Mitchelstown Baile Mhistéala (Irish)
- Town
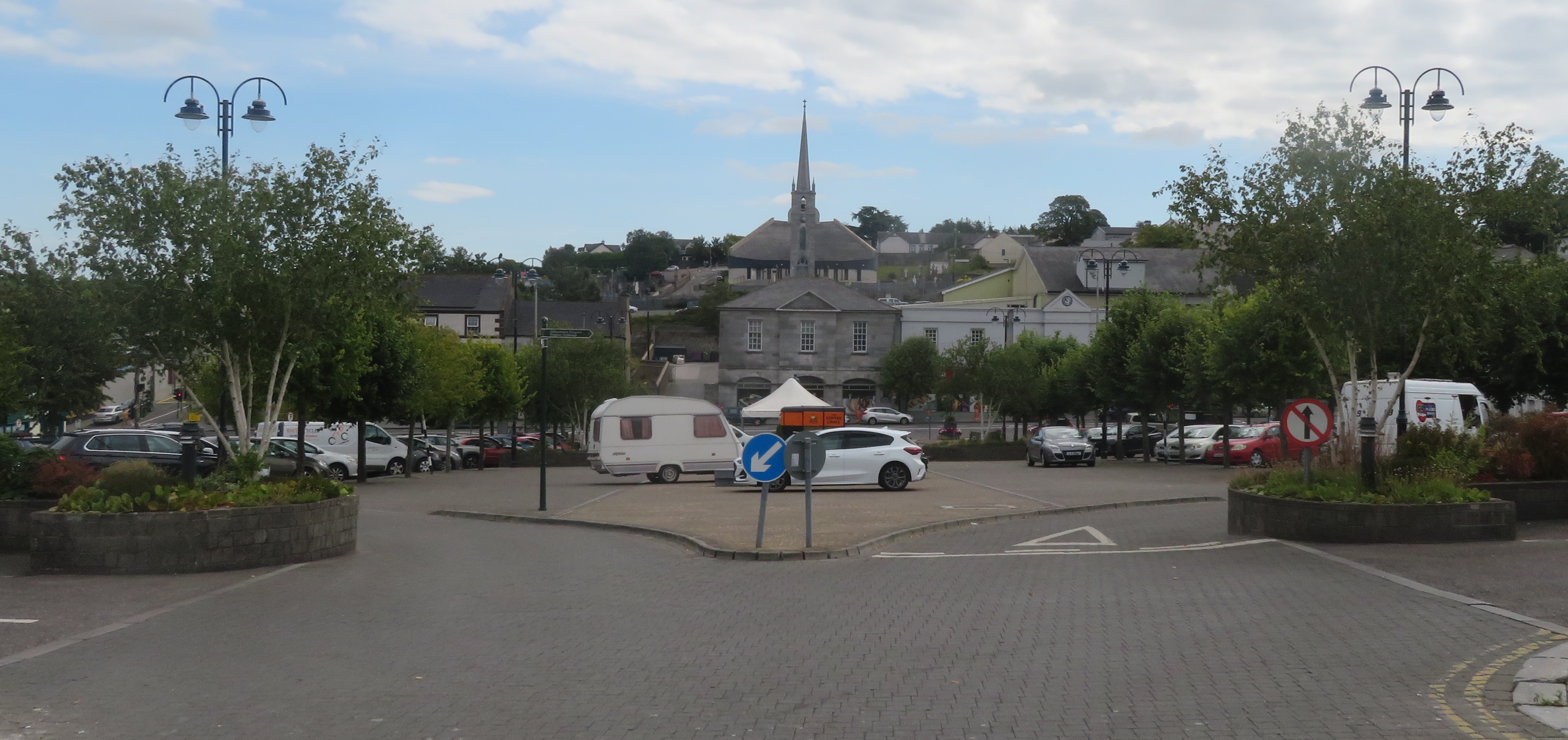
- New Square

- Location in Ireland
- Coordinates: 52.2656°N 8.2699°W
- Country: Ireland
- Province: Munster
- County: County Cork
- Elevation: 103 m (338 ft)

Population (2022)
  - Total: 3,744
- Irish grid reference: R818127

Historical population
| Year | Pop. | ±% |
|---|---|---|
| 1821 | 3,773 | — |
| 1831 | 3,545 | −6.0% |
| 1841 | 4,181 | +17.9% |
| 1851 | 3,084 | −26.2% |
| 1861 | 2,922 | −5.3% |
| 1871 | 2,743 | −6.1% |
| 1881 | 2,467 | −10.1% |
| 1891 | 2,312 | −6.3% |
| 1901 | 2,146 | −7.2% |
| 1911 | 2,268 | +5.7% |
| 1926 | 2,146 | −5.4% |
| 1936 | 1,902 | −11.4% |
| 1946 | 2,054 | +8.0% |
| 1951 | 2,148 | +4.6% |
| 1956 | 2,674 | +24.5% |
| 1961 | 2,655 | −0.7% |
| 1966 | 2,617 | −1.4% |
| 1971 | 2,783 | +6.3% |
| 1981 | 3,106 | +11.6% |
| 1986 | 3,210 | +3.3% |
| 1991 | 3,090 | −3.7% |
| 1996 | 3,123 | +1.1% |
| 2002 | 3,300 | +5.7% |
| 2006 | 3,365 | +2.0% |
| 2011 | 3,677 | +9.3% |
| 2016 | 3,740 | +1.7% |
| 2022 | 3,744 | +0.1% |

Mitchelstown (Irish: Baile Mhistéala) is a town in the north of County Cork, Ireland with a population of over 3,740. It is situated in the valley to the south of the Galtee Mountains. Mitchelstown is 13 km south-west of the Mitchelstown Cave, 53 km north of Cork City, 56 km south-east of Limerick City and 15 km north of Fermoy. The town is close to the M8 motorway which links Cork and Dublin.

Mitchelstown has been described as one of the "finest Georgian planned towns" in Ireland. The River Gradoge runs by the town into the River Funshion, which in turn is a tributary of the River Blackwater. Mitchelstown is within the Dáil constituency of Cork East.

== Name ==
Prior to the 12th century Anglo-Norman invasion of Ireland, the area around Mitchelstown was known as "Caoille", a territory bounded by the Kilworth Mountains to the south and the Galtee Mountains to the north. It was occupied by a people known as the Fir Muighe – the "men of the plain".

The name of Mitchelstown originates from the Anglo-Norman family called de St Michel who founded a settlement close to the site of the present town in the 13th century. Their family name was well attested among Anglo-Normans in this area of Munster. (A reference in 1288 to a Geoffrey Michel in the 'vill of Michel', appears to refer to Mitchelstown townland in County Limerick.) Today's Mitchelstown and Baile Mhistéala names evolved from several varied spellings, a number of which are listed in the Placenames Database of Ireland. The database records 1618 as the earliest instance of today's standard English version.

== History ==
Before the development of Mitchelstown, a 7th-century settlement was established in the nearby townland of Brigown. Brigown (Irish: Brí Ghabhann, meaning "hill of the smiths") was founded by a monk named Fionnchú (Findchú in Old Irish), now popularly known as Saint Fanahan. On the eastern side of the town is a holy well associated with the saint that is traditionally visited on 25 November, his annual pattern day. By the 9th century, Brigown had a round tower (this tower was damaged in a lightning strike in 1720 and demolished in 1807).

Mitchelstown itself is based at or near the site of a 13th-century Norman settlement called "Villa Michel". During the 13th century, "Villa Michel" was granted market rights giving it a commercial focus within the region. From about 1300 to 1600, the town was the property of the White Knights, chiefs of the Clan Gibbon (FitzGibbons), a branch of the Earls of Desmond. The White Knights were lords over large portions of modern-day counties Cork, Limerick and Tipperary consisting of an estate of over 40,000 hectares. The first Mitchelstown Castle was built by the White Knights during the 14th century and it lasted until the 1770s. The original town appears to have evolved from a cluster of cabins and laneways around this castle.

The area known as Kingston College (or "King's Square") was built around 1764 by James King, 4th Baron Kingston for the cost of £12,000. It was initially established as housing for elderly, impoverished Protestants. When James died in 1764, his 10-year-old granddaughter Caroline FitzGerald inherited the estate. Five years later, she married her 15-year-old cousin, Robert King, Viscount Kingsborough. The revolutionary writer Mary Wollstonecraft, briefly worked as a governess to three of their daughters.

The medieval town was demolished and replaced by the present town which is centred more to the south-east. The town was laid out in a grid pattern of two main streets intersected by a number of smaller streets. Some of its streets are named after members of the King family, namely Robert, George, Edward, James, Thomas and also King (the family name). The other streets of the Georgian town are Church Street, Baldwin Street, Alley Lane, Chapel Hill, Convent Hill, King Square, New Square and Mulberry Lane.

The layout established by the second and third Earls of Kingston, between 1776 and 1830, utilised the natural features of the site to give views of the Galtee Mountains. This is best illustrated by how George Street was designed with Saint George's Arts and Heritage Centre (formerly Saint George's Church) closing the view on the southern end, and the northern view being terminated by Kingston College and Temple Hill on the Galtee Mountains.

Mitchelstown Castle was rebuilt between 1823 and 1825 by George King, 3rd Earl of Kingston.

During the Irish Civil War in 1922, the castle was occupied by the Irish Republican Army. During six weeks of occupation, its contents were looted and the building was burnt on the night 12 and 13 August 1922 – ostensibly to prevent it from being used by the Irish Free State army. The ashlar limestone of the house stood as a ruin until about 1930 when it was bought by the monks of Mount Melleray Abbey who used it to build their new monastery in County Waterford.

=== Mitchelstown massacre ===
Between 1879 and 1881, and again between 1886 and 1888, local tenantry, led by John Mandeville and William O'Brien, MP, organised a rent strike on the Mitchelstown Estate, then owned by Anna, Dowager Countess of Kingston and her second husband, William Downes Webber. On 9 September 1887, a protest was held later in the day in New Market Square outside the Market House where Mandeville and O'Brien were being tried. Neither man appeared in court. After the court ended, approximately 8,000 demonstrators paraded into New Square. As the speeches began from a wagon in the square, the police attempted to get an official police notetaker closer to the platform so that he could hear and record what was being said. Their motives were misunderstood, and they were held back by the crowd. They retreated, returning moments later with fifty reinforcements. This time, they fixed bayonets and used the butts of their rifles to hit horses that had been placed around the edge of the crowd to prevent their access to the wagon. In the melee that followed, hand-to-hand combat involving police being beaten with sticks and stones being thrown at them. The police retreated to their barracks, which was on a house that overlooked part of the square. As the last constable arrived at the barracks, he drew his revolver and fired a single shot into the air. This created confusion amongst the police inside the barracks, who by that time had been placed at the upstairs windows with carbine rifles. Several shots were fired into the crowd. Three men were killed and several more injured. The dead men were John Shinnick of Fermoy, John Casey of Kilbehenny and Michael Lonergan of Galbally, County Limerick. The incident generated considerable international attention and became known as the "Mitchelstown Massacre". The phrase "Remember Mitchelstown" (first coined by William Gladstone) became a rallying cry for Irishmen at home and abroad. The memorial to Mandeville that stands in Market Square was unveiled in 1906 by William O'Brien MP. It also commemorates the names of the three men killed in 1887.

== Economy ==
=== Co-operative ===
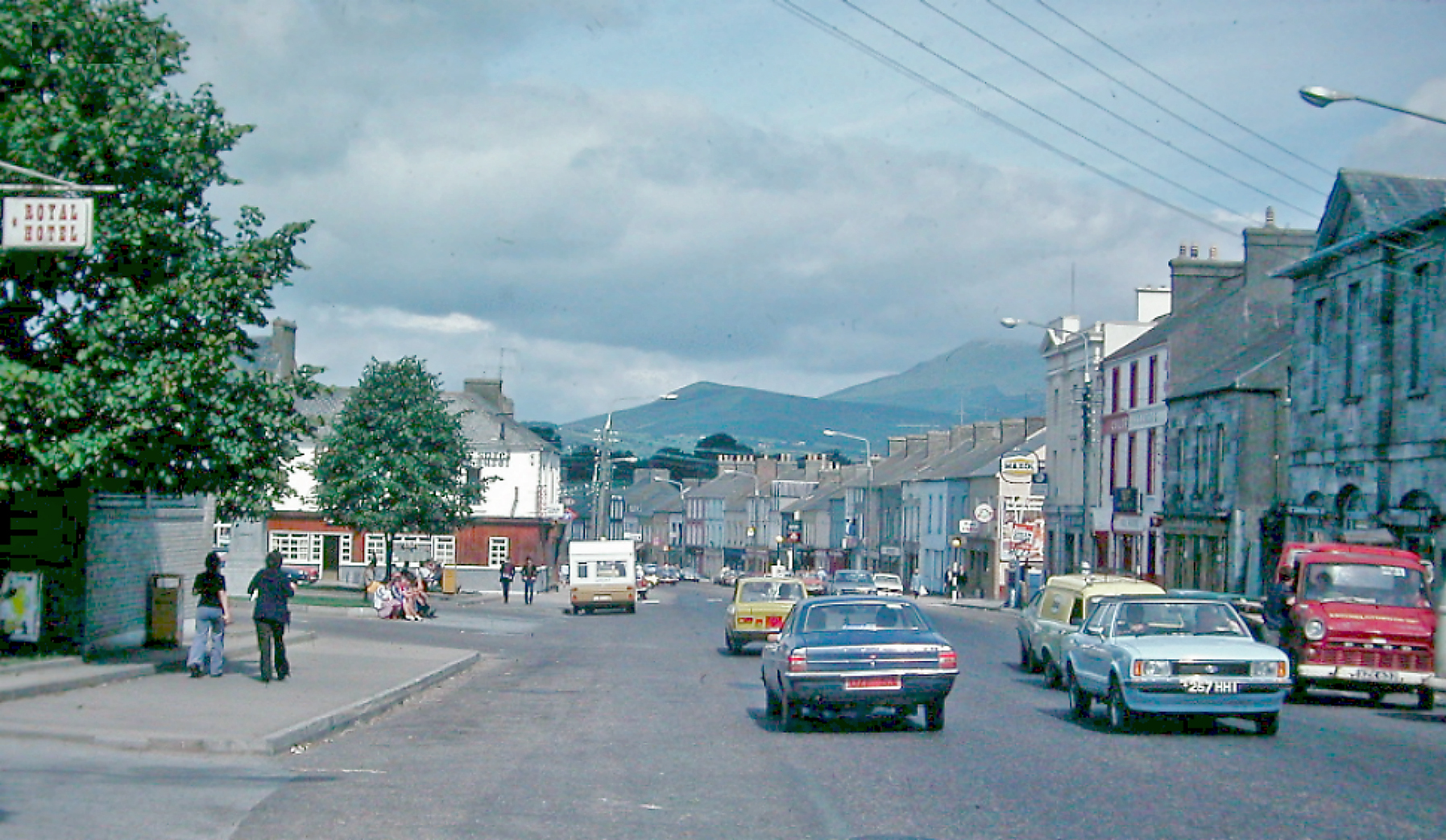
Streetscape in 1978

Up to 1990, Mitchelstown was the headquarters for Mitchelstown Co-operative Agricultural Society Ltd, one of the largest co-operatives in Ireland. This farmers co-op was founded in 1919. Between 1919 and 1990, Mitchelstown Co-op Creameries became the largest dairy processing business on the island of Ireland. While it became known for its processed cheese brands, it was better known in overseas dairy industry circles for its natural cheeses, which were exported around Europe and for which it earned several international prizes.

In the 1930s, the co-op promoted the introduction of intensive pig production in the area as another source of farm income, and several of Ireland's largest industrial pig farms were subsequently based in the Mitchelstown area.

In October 1990, Mitchelstown Co-operative merged with Ballyclough Co-operative (based in Mallow, County Cork) to create an enlarged Dairygold Co-Operative. The co-op is now the largest farmer owned co-operative in Ireland and has its headquarters in Mitchelstown. One of the first managers of Mitchelstown Creameries was Eamon Roche, who was credited with the organisation's massive growth.

Today Mitchelstown is home to Kerrygold Park, a €40 million butter production and packing facility supplying the Kerrygold butter brand worldwide.

== Transport ==
=== Road ===
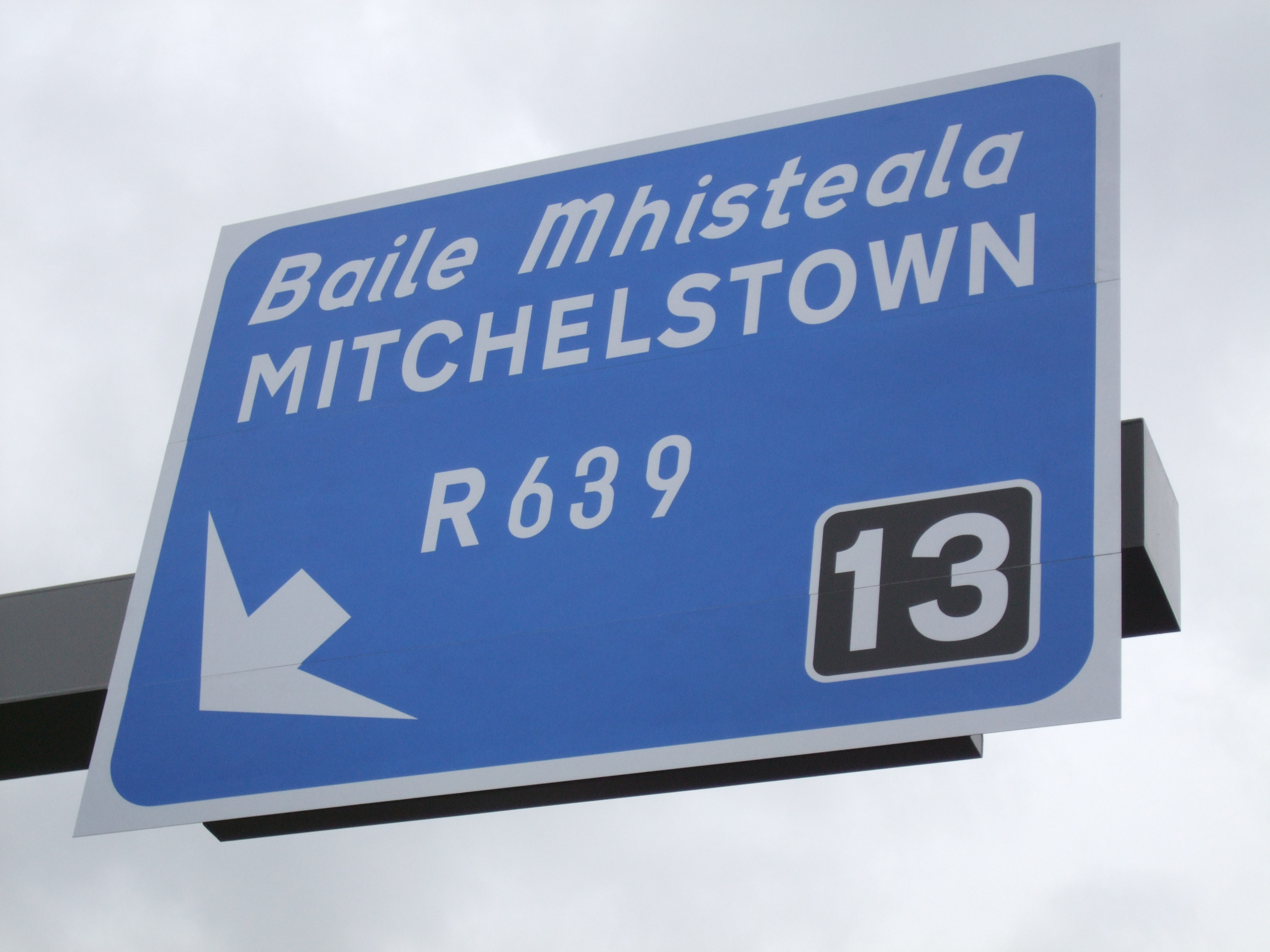
Cantilever sign for access to Mitchelstown from the M8, 3 km south of the town.

Mitchelstown is situated close to the M8 Dublin to Cork motorway, which runs to the east and can be accessed from Junctions 12 and 13.

A relief road, located to the west of the town, serves to filter N73 traffic towards Mallow and R513 traffic towards Limerick. The construction of the relief road to the west and north, and its connection in 2009 to the M8 to the east of Mitchelstown, means that the town has become the smallest in Ireland to have a full 360-degree ring road. Prior to the opening of the relief road in 2006, the N8 ran through Mitchelstown itself, seriously congesting the main street. The R665 road connects Mitchelstown to Clonmel, while the former N8 now redesignated as the R639 provides an alternative route from Mitchelstown to Cork, Fermoy and Cahir.

=== Bus ===
Bus Éireann runs the 245X service through the town providing a service to Dublin, Cahir, Cashel, Fermoy and Cork. Bus Éireann also operates the 245 which serves stops between Mitchelstown and Clonmel as well as towns between Mitchelstown and Cork including Fermoy and Watergrasshill. Since late 2022, there has been an expanded route 328 service between Mitchelstown and Limerick city, which serves several intermediate stops.

=== Rail ===
Mitchelstown railway station opened on 23 March 1891, closed to passenger and goods traffic on 27 January 1947, and closed on 1 December 1953.

== Mitchelstown caves ==
The Mitchelstown Caves are limestone caves located near the R639, between Mitchelstown and Cahir. One cave, Mitchelstown Cave itself, is privately owned and has been developed as a show cave, with a number of caverns open to the public through a guided tour. Some of the speleothems are noteworthy including the Tower of Babel formation. Various other stalactites, stalagmites and rock formations are also named for their unique structures.

== Events ==
Indiependence, an annual three-day festival weekender, typically takes place on the outskirts of Mitchelstown over the August Bank Holiday. The event has previously hosted acts like Editors, Bastille, Lewis Capaldi, Hozier, Public Enemy, Picture This, The Coronas, Ash, and Feeder.

== Notable people ==
- Seán Clancy, Air Corps general, former Chief of Staff of the Irish Defence Forces
- Michael Francis Crotty (born 1970), Roman Catholic prelate and diplomat, current Apostolic Nuncio to Burkina Faso and Niger and titular archbishop of Lindisfarne, grew up in Skeheen
- John Dunne (1845–1919), Roman Catholic prelate, Bishop of Bathurst
- Liam Hamilton (1928–2000), judge and barrister, former Chief Justice of Ireland
- Mark Keane, professional Australian rules footballer
- Margaret King (1773–1835), hostess, writer, traveller and medical adviser
- John Roach (1815–1887), proprietor of America's largest post-Civil War shipbuilding empire, John Roach & Sons
- Kevin Roche (1922–2019), American architect and son of Eamon Roche, Mitchelstown Co-operative Creameries' first general manager, raised in the town
- William Trevor (1928–2016), author, five-time Booker Prize nominee, born and spent his early childhood in the town

== See also ==
- Market Houses in Ireland
