= M8 motorway (Ireland) =

Motorway in Ireland

M8 motorway
- Mótarbhealach M8
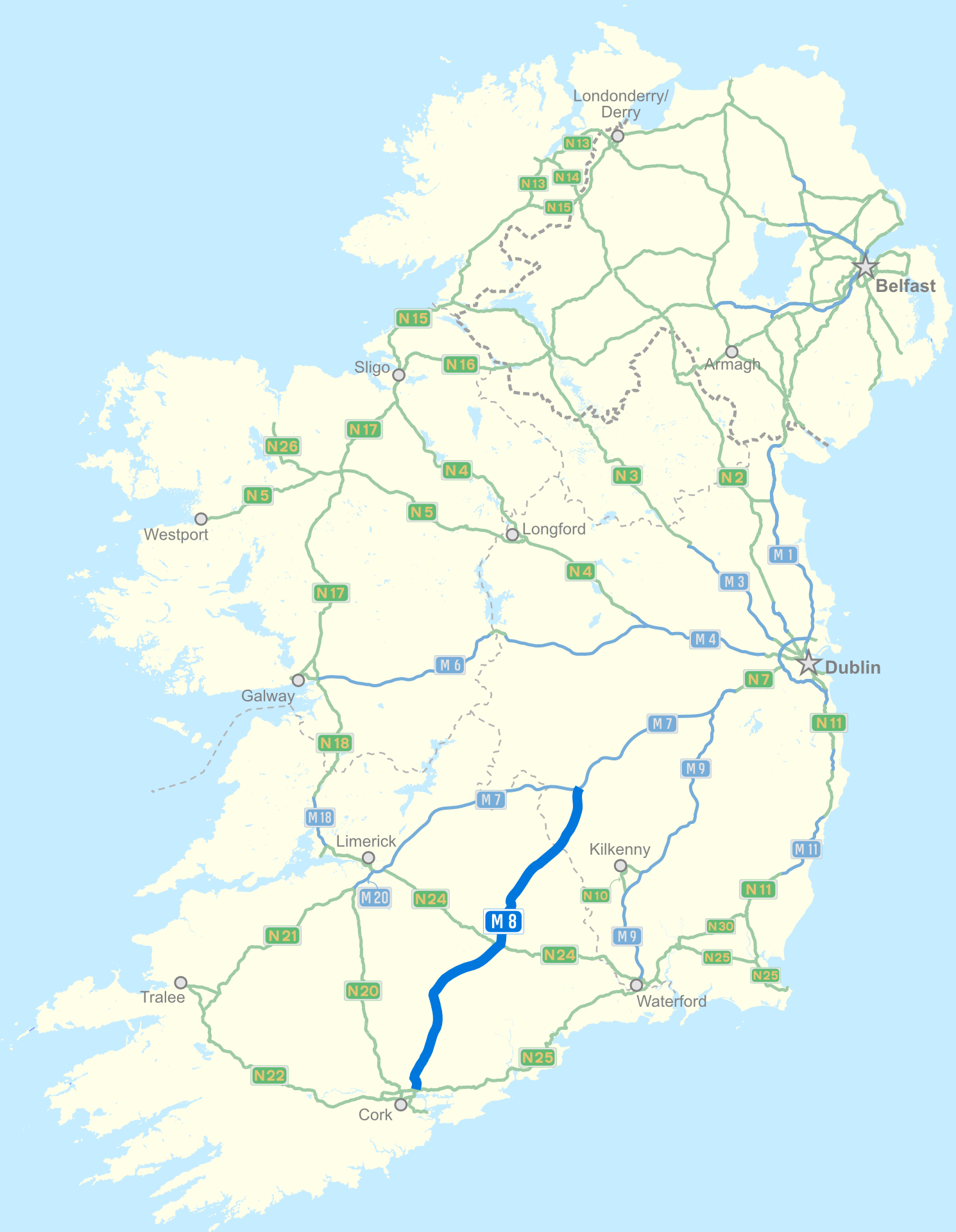
- Clickable image

Route information
- Part of E201
- Length: 147 km (91 mi)
- Existed: 1992–present
- History: Constructed 1985–2010

Major junctions
- From: M7 junction 19
- J1 → M7 motorway J5 → N75 road J6 → N62 road J9 → N74 road J10 → N24 road J12 → N73 road J19 → N25 road, N40 road
- To: Dunkettle Interchange, Cork

Location
- Country: Ireland
- Primary destinations: Dublin, Cork, Fermoy, Thurles, Cashel

Highway system
- Roads in Ireland; Motorways; Primary; Secondary; Regional

The M8 motorway (Irish: Mótarbhealach M8) is an inter-urban motorway in Ireland, which forms part of the motorway from the capital Dublin to Cork city. The 149 km (93 mi) motorway commences in the townland of Aghaboe, County Laois and runs through the counties of Kilkenny, Tipperary and Limerick, terminating at the Dunkettle interchange in Cork City. First called for in the Road Needs Study (1998), it was later incorporated into the National Development Plan (2000–2006) and later still formed part of the Irish Government's Transport 21 plan for infrastructural development. The majority of the M8, 115 km (71 mi), was built between 2006 and 2010. On 28 May 2010, the motorway was completed and had replaced almost all of the single-carriageway N8 except for a short section of urban road in Cork City.

== Route ==
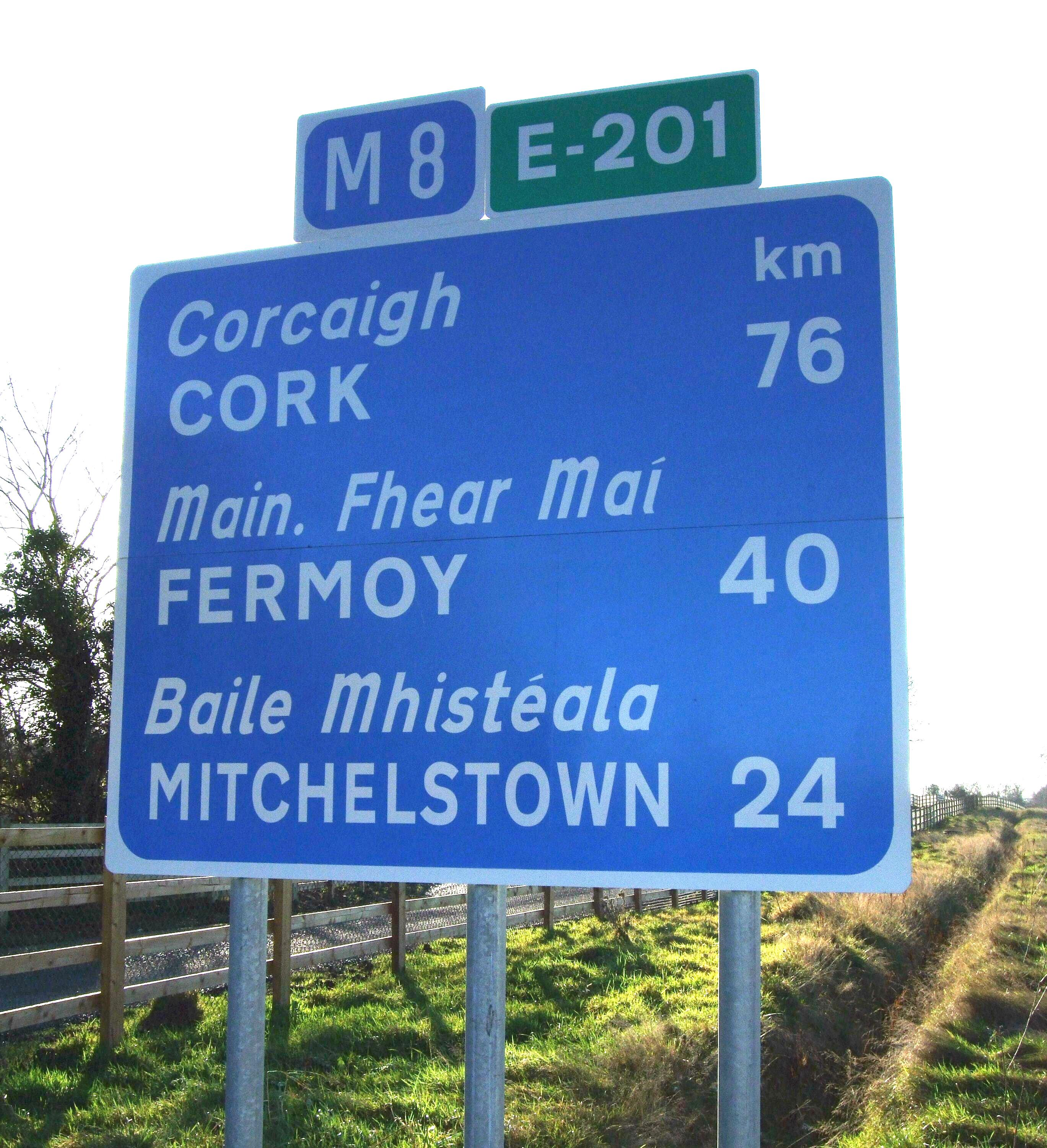
Route confirmation sign for the M8/E201 at junction 11.

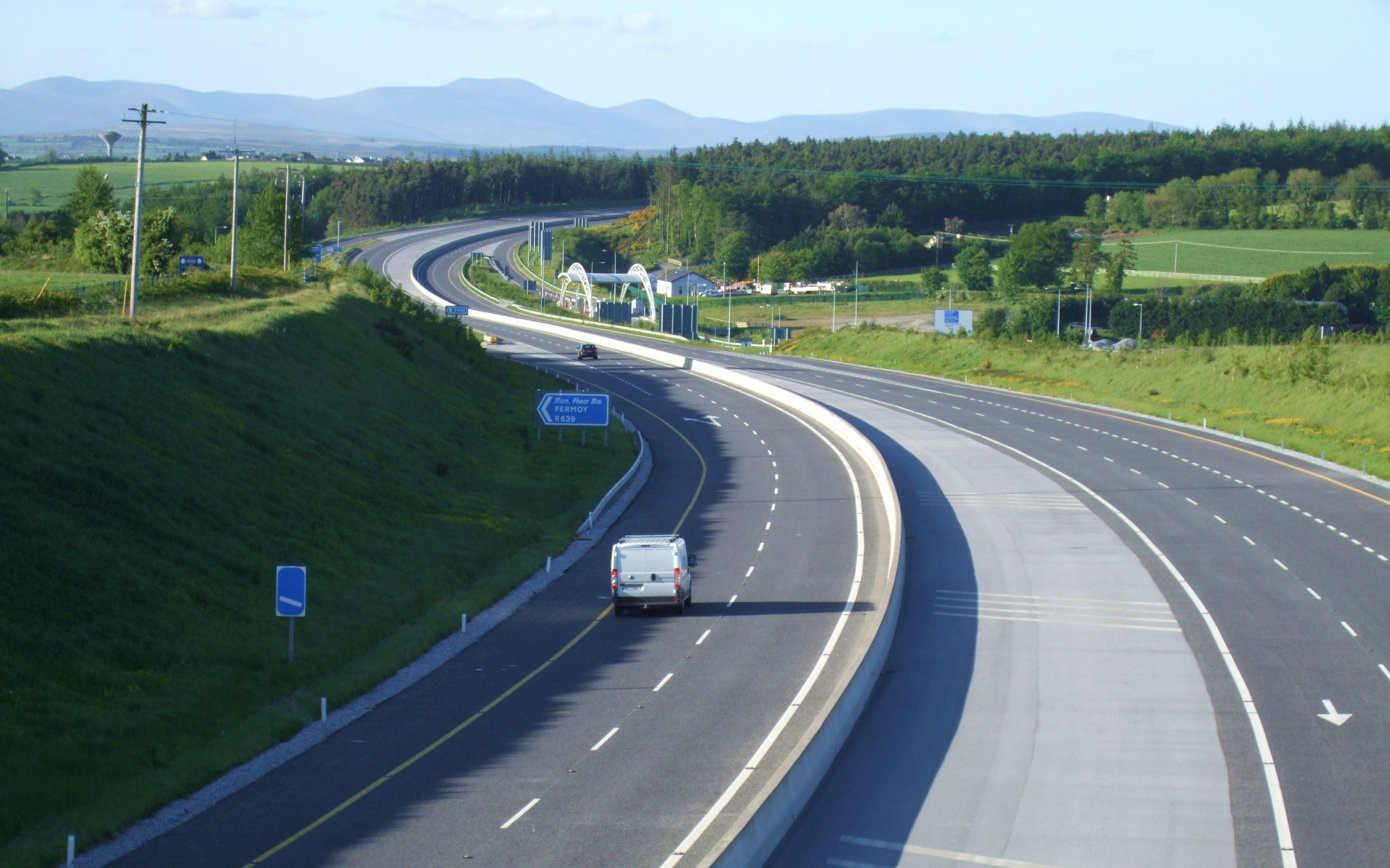
The M8 at junction 15.

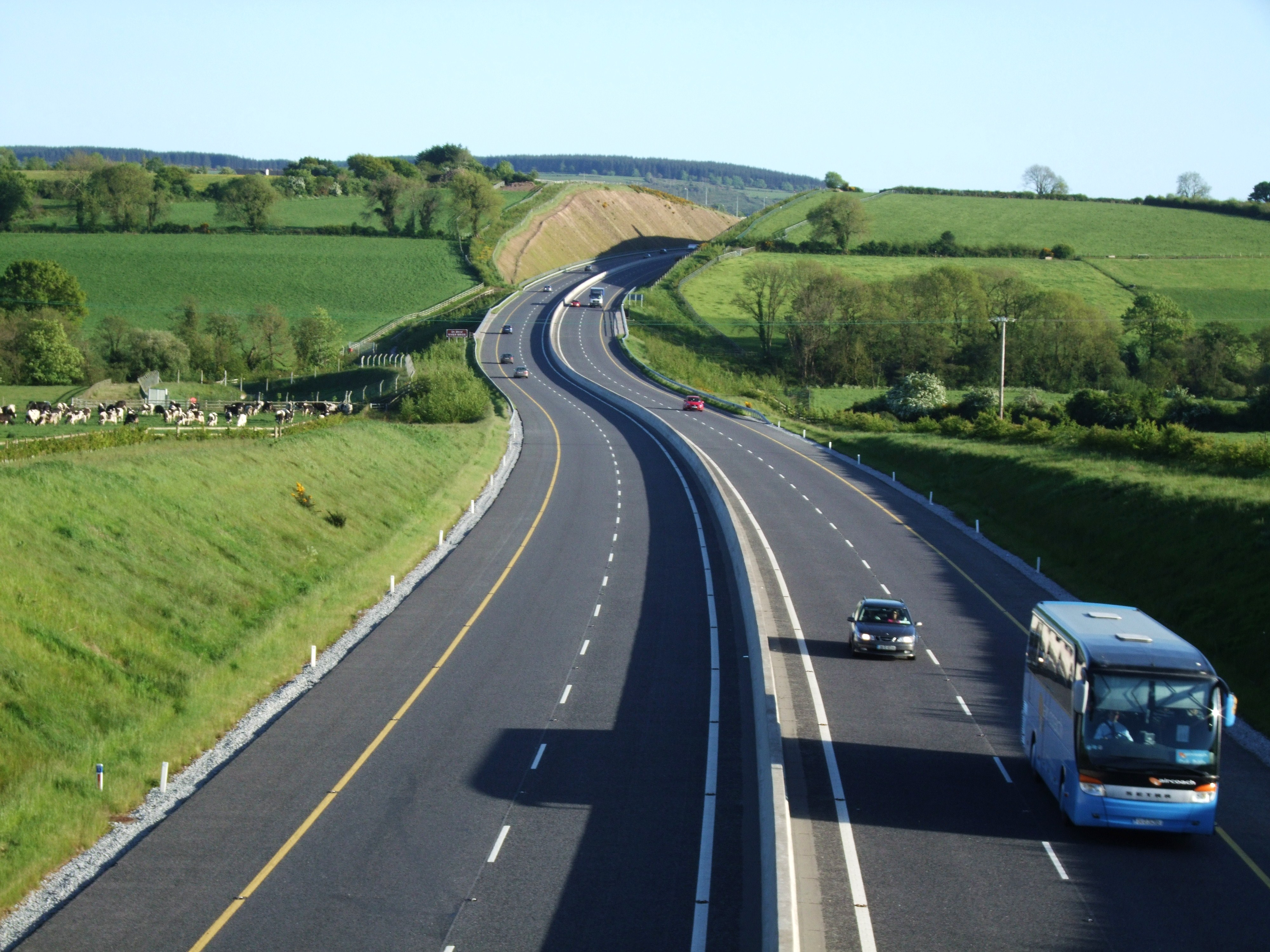
The M8 tolled section approaching its southern terminus near Watergrasshill.

The route starts in the townland of Aghaboe, County Laois, at a motorway-to-motorway interchange with the M7. From here it proceeds southwards, passing under the R434 and R433 roads until it runs parallel to the single-carriageway R639 road, bypassing Abbeyleix, Durrow, Cullahill, Johnstown, Urlingford, Littleton, Horse and Jockey, Cashel, New Inn, Cahir, Skeheenarinky, Kilbeheny, Mitchelstown, Kilworth, Fermoy, Rathcormac, Watergrasshill and Glanmire.

Between its junction with the M7 and Dunkettle, the M8 passes through pasture in County Laois, and over bogland and coniferous forest through County Kilkenny and County Tipperary. South of Cashel, it enters the Golden Vale and crosses the River Suir west of Cahir. The motorway then travels south-west along the Galtee Mountains, passing Glengarra Wood and Mitchelstown Cave. East of the route, the Knockmealdown Mountains and the Comeraghs are starkly visible. The M8 crosses into County Cork south of Kilbeheny and proceeds south to the east of Mitchelstown, before skirting around the base of Kilworth Mountain through pastoral farmland and demesne parkland. At Moorepark, some 5 km (3 mi) north of Fermoy, the M8 is tolled for the next 17.5 km (11 mi). This tolled section incorporates an impressive 450m viaduct crossing of the River Blackwater. Toll plazas are located between junctions 16 and 17 and at the southbound exit of junction 15. The current toll for cars is €2.00. Many motorists, particularly lorry drivers, drive through Fermoy, Rathcormac and Watergrasshill to avoid the toll. In 2006 the Irish Road Haulage Association advised its members not to use the toll road, because they considered it to be too expensive. Consequently, traffic volumes through Watergrasshill increased by about 6,000 vehicles (of which approximately 1,100 were lorries) per day at the end of that year. By the end of 2008 increasing numbers of vehicles were opting to pay the toll. The M8 continues south, bypassing Watergrasshill, Sallybrook, Riverstown and Glanmire, before ending 450m north of the Jack Lynch Tunnel at the approach to the Dunkettle Interchange (which has recently been converted to a freeflow interchange since Feb 2024), which connects it with the N25 to Waterford, the N40 Cork South Ring Road (a ring road of Cork) and the N8 to Cork city centre. Despite having a nominal nineteen junctions, the motorway in fact only has eighteen, because the proposed junction 2 was never constructed.

== History ==
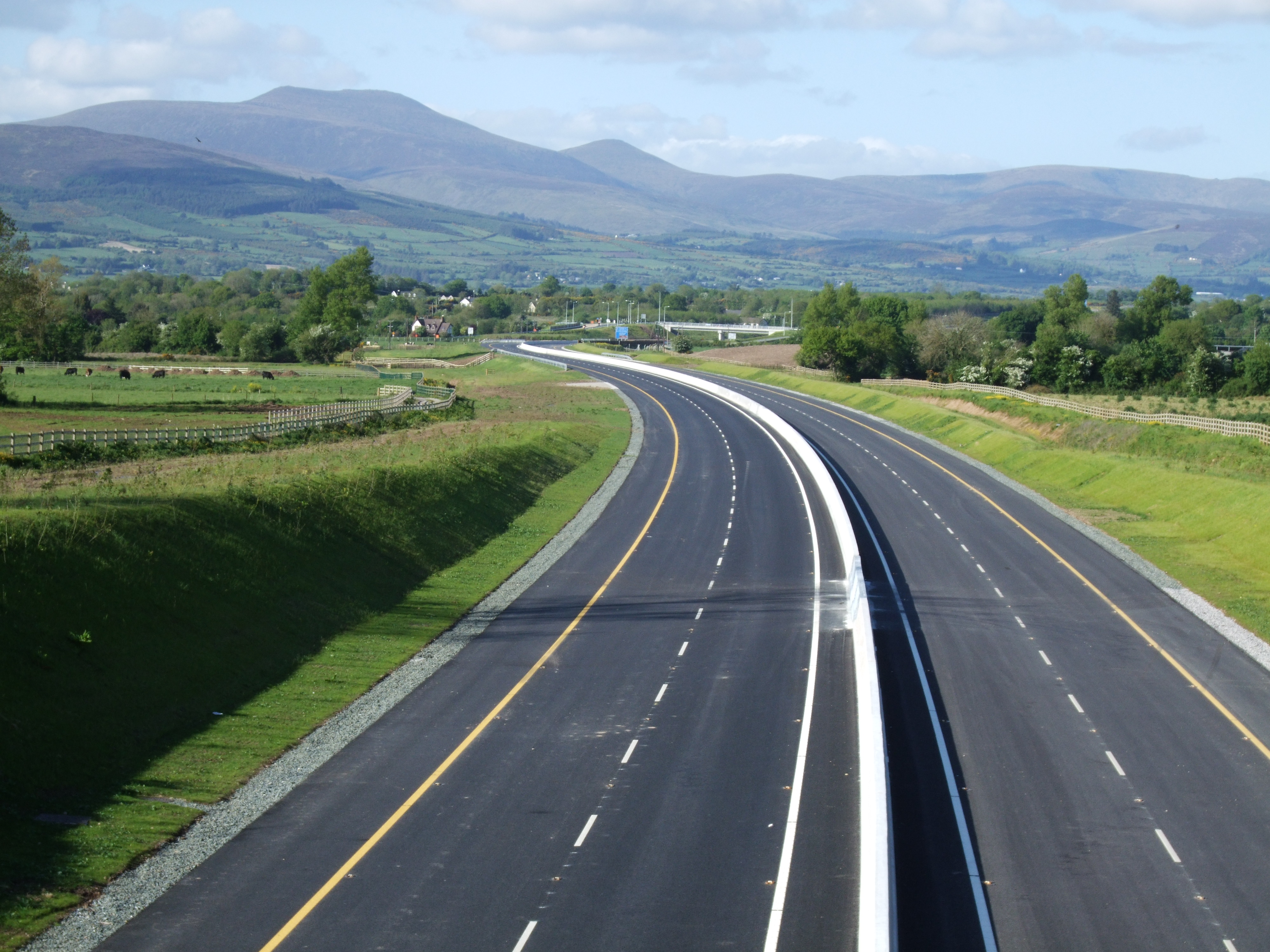
The M8 under construction approaching the Galtee Mountains east of Mitchelstown.

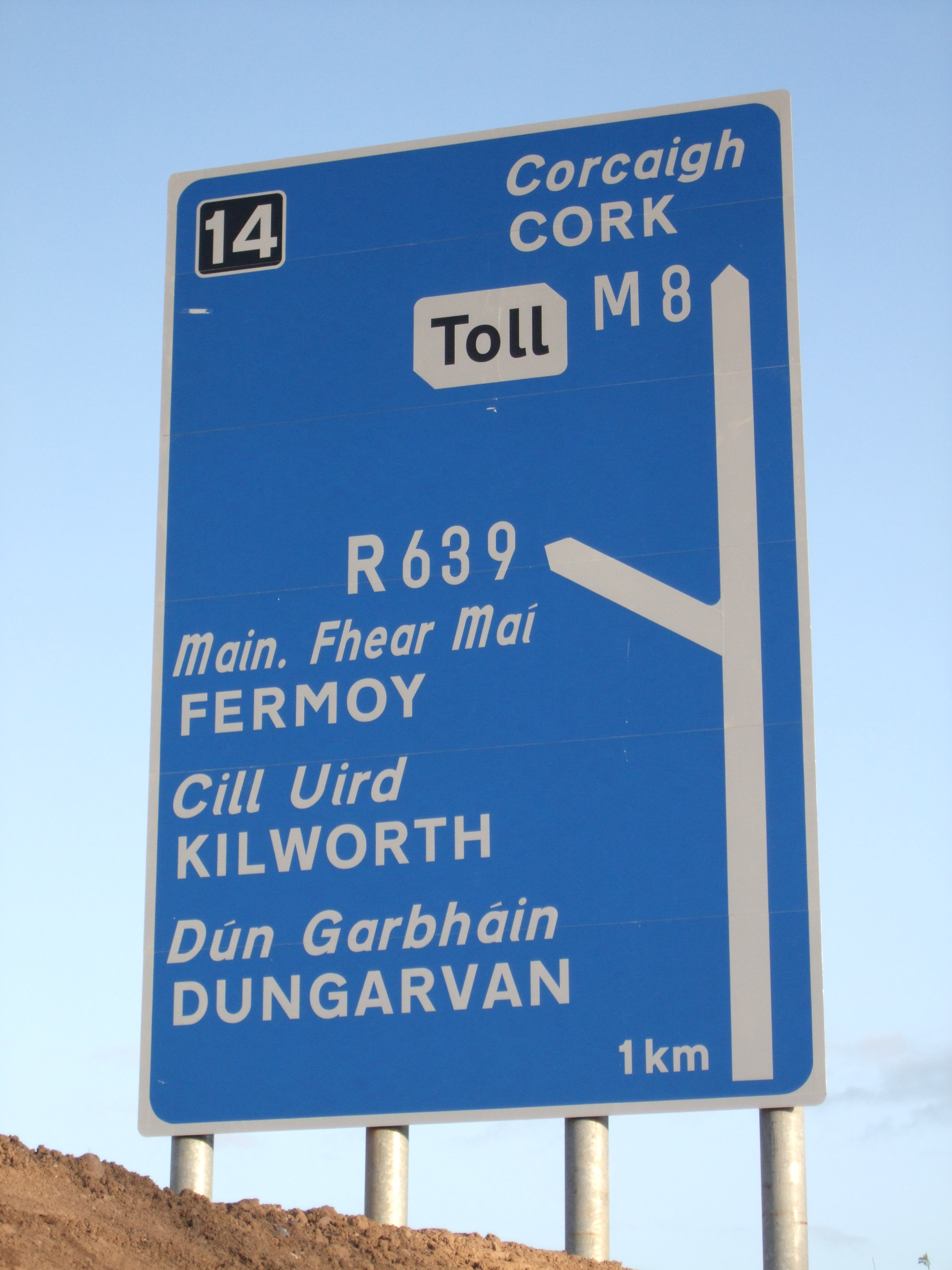
Road Signage at Junction 14 on the M8.

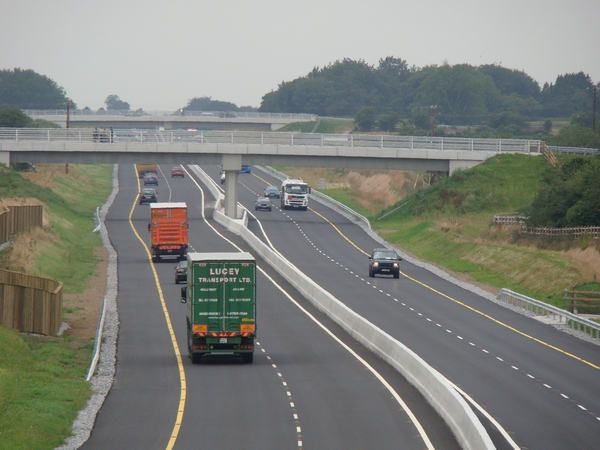
Section of the M8 between Mitchelstown and Cahir.

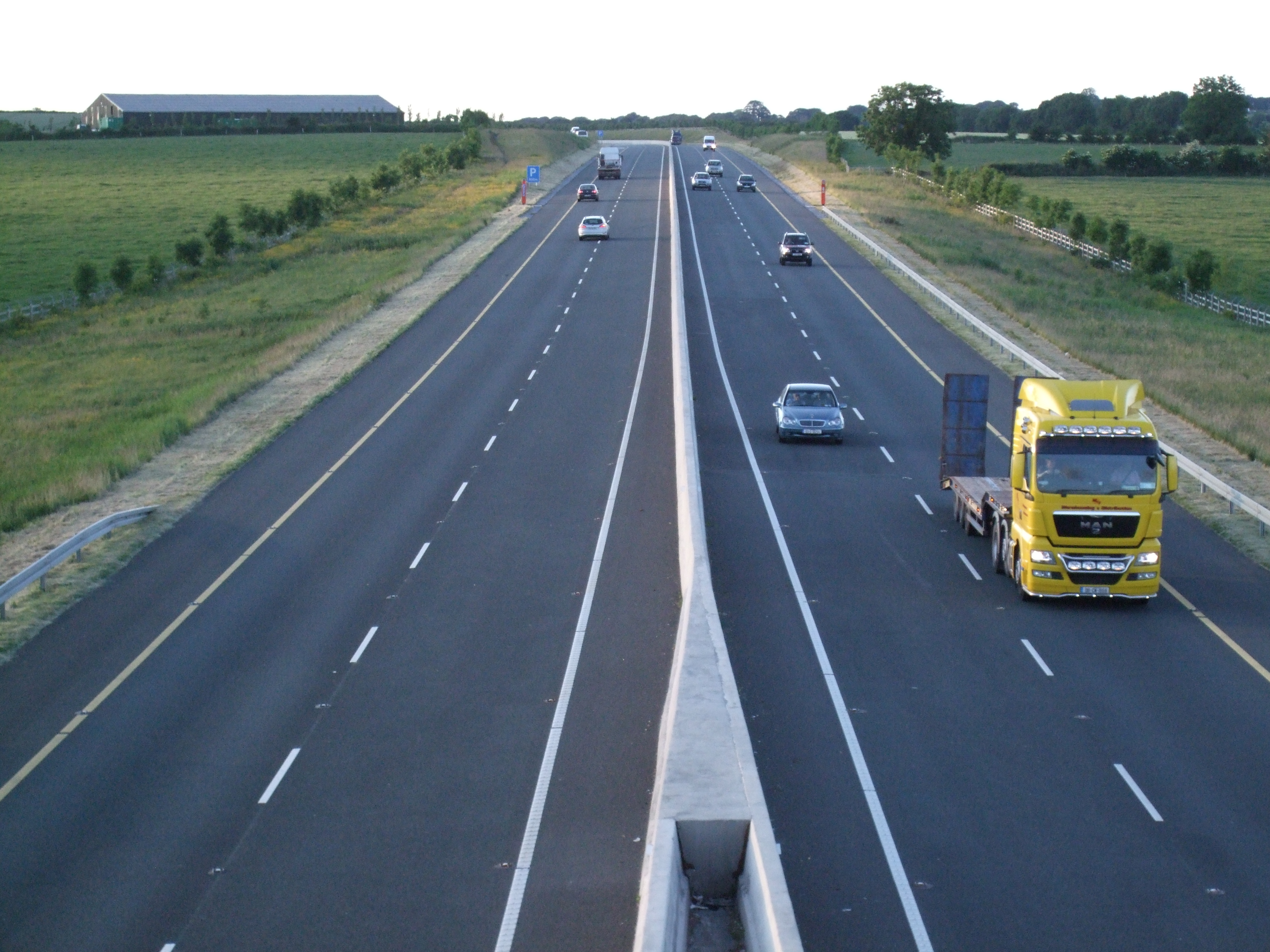
The M8 west of Rockwell College, through County Tipperary.

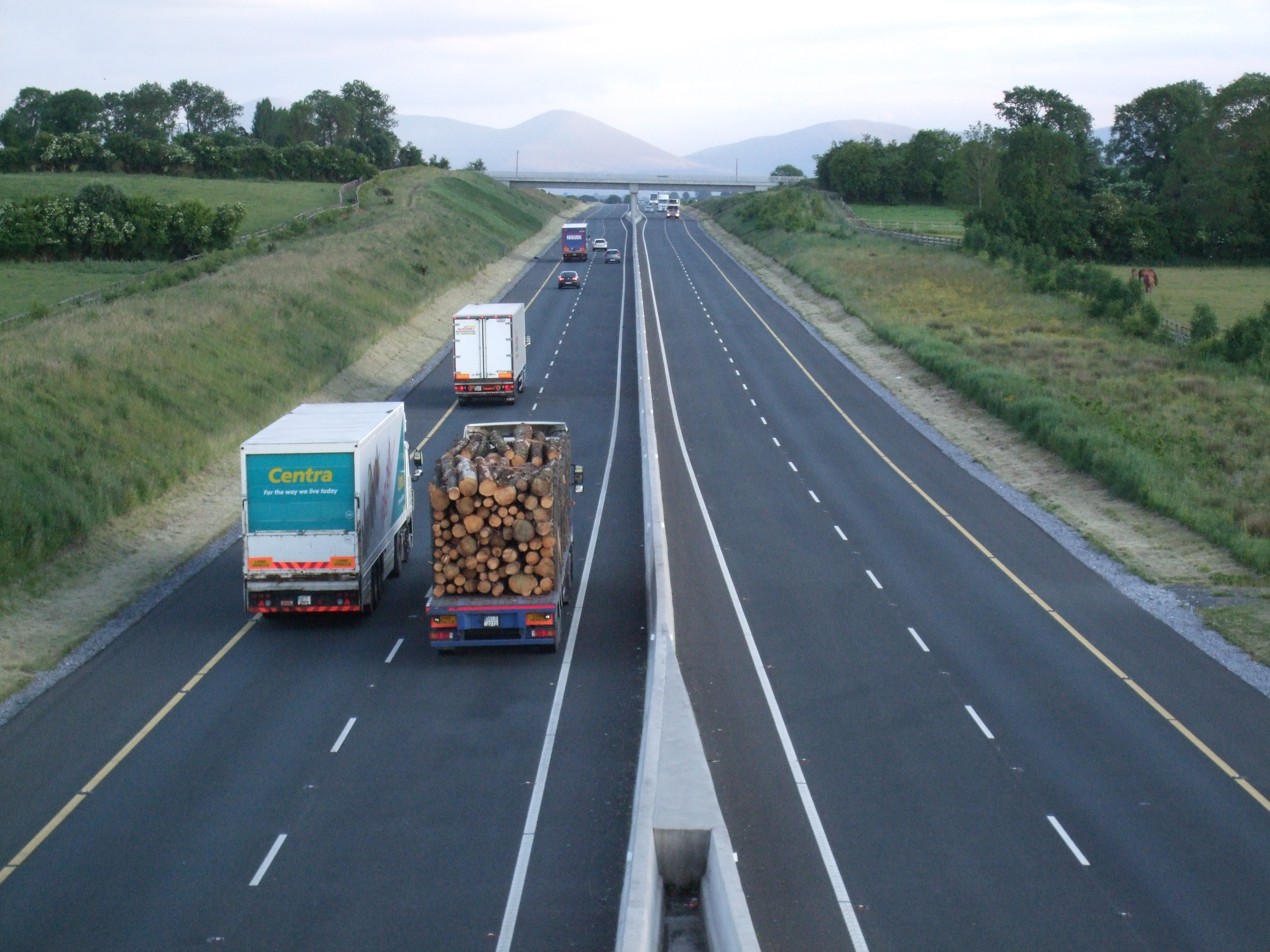
The M8 west of New Inn between Cashel and Cahir, with the Knockmealdown Mountains visible in the background.

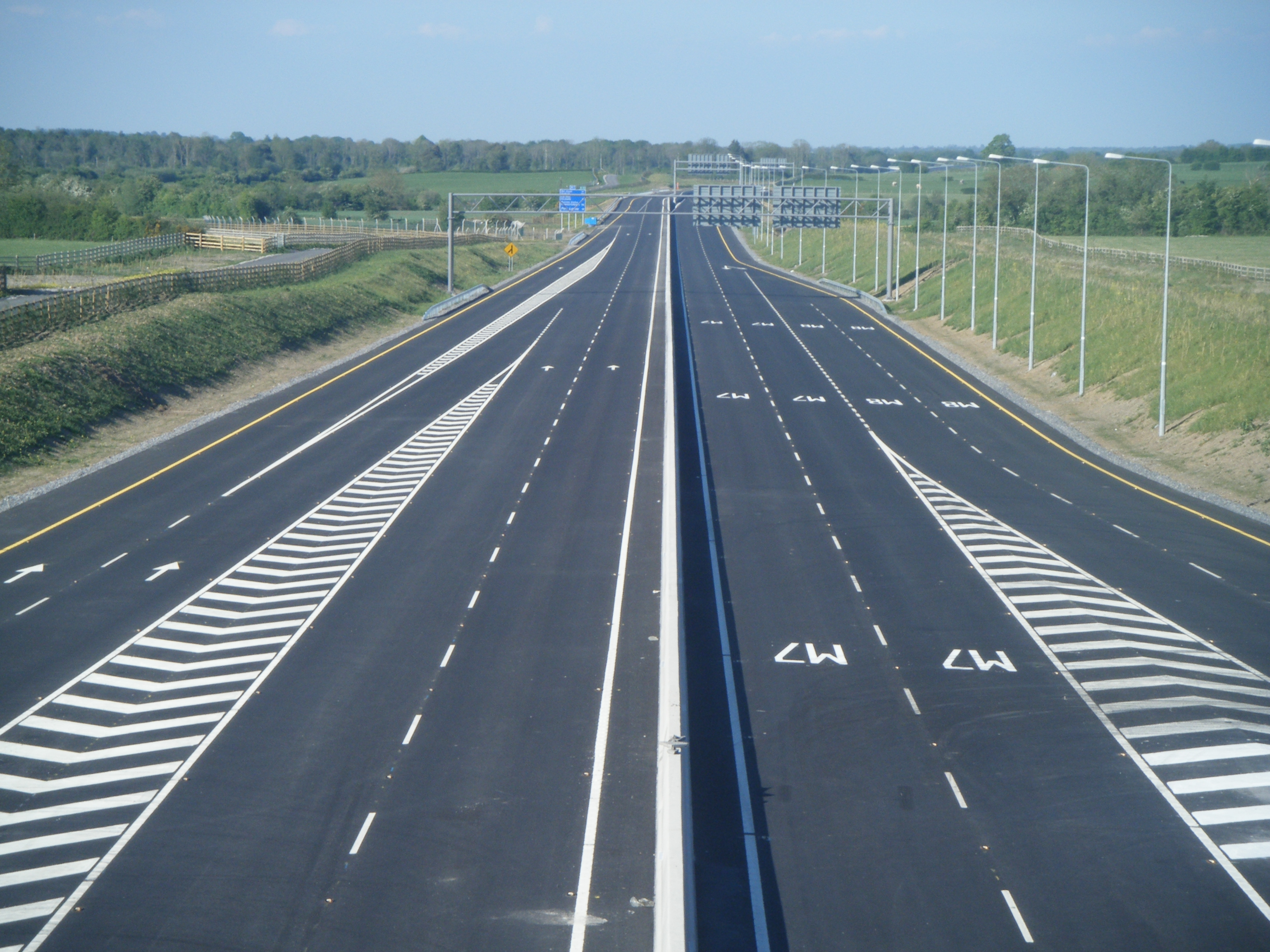
The start of the M8 in County Laois where it diverges from the M7, just days before the scheme opened to traffic on 28 May 2010.

The M8 was constructed in eight stages between 1985 and 2010. Some of the sections which now form part of the M8 were initially opened as dual-carriageway and previously formed part of the N8, while other sections were opened as motorway.

In chronological order, the various sections opened as follows (status on opening in brackets):

- Glanmire Bypass (April 1992, as dual carriageway) – junctions 19 to 18;
- Watergrasshill-Glanmire (with Watergrasshill Bypass) (September 2003), as HQDC – junctions 17 to 18;
- Cashel Bypass (October 2004, as standard dual carriageway) – junctions 7 to 9;
- Fermoy-Watergrasshill (with Fermoy Bypass) (October 2006, as motorway) – junction 14 to 17;
- Cashel-Mitchelstown (July 2008, as HQDC) – junctions 9 to 12;
- Cashel-Cullahill (December 2008, as motorway) – junctions 7 to 4;
- Mitchelstown-Fermoy (May 2009, as motorway) – junctions 12 to 14;
- Cullahill-Portlaoise (May 2010, as motorway) – junctions 4 to 1.

=== Glanmire Bypass ===
The Glanmire Bypass opened as a 6.3 km (4 mi) dual carriageway on 3 April 1992, after a construction period of almost seven years, representing the first major improvement made to the Cork to Portlaoise corridor. Called for in the 'Land Use and Transportation Study' (LUTS) Report of 1976, the bypass replaced the older road through Glanmire village and was envisaged as part of broader strategic roads upgrade to service an expanding Cork City. Other components of this plan, such as the N40 South Ring Road and the Jack Lynch Tunnel, were substantially delivered and operational by 1999. The Glanmire Bypass was built by multiple contractors at a cost of 45 million punts. It was reclassified as a motorway in July 2009 and was officially incorporated into the rest of the M8 route on 28 August 2009.

=== Watergrasshill Bypass ===
The Watergrasshill Bypass was the second section of grade separated dual carriageway to open on the Cork-Portlaoise route. It opened on 12 September 2003, at a cost of €144 million. Built by Mowlem and Bowen in partnership, the seven kilometre (5 mile) route replaced a winding and narrow section of the older N8 (now the R639) through Watergrasshill and Sallybrook villages. The Watergrasshill Bypass was the cause of some controversy in October 2006 when its northern junction was incorporated into the tolled 'Fermoy Bypass' section of the M8, as, previously, it had been untolled. As with the Glanmire Bypass, the Watergrasshill Bypass officially became a part of the M8 on 28 August 2009.

=== Cashel Bypass ===
Construction of the €48 million 6.7 km (4.2 mi) Cashel bypass began in May 2003 and it opened to traffic in October 2004 with a speed limit of 100 km/h. Originally classified as a standard dual carriageway section of the then N8, the scheme was officially redesignated a motorway by Statutory Instrument on 17 July 2008. This change came into effect on 24 September in the same year and blue motorway signage replaced the green signage erected in 2004. In addition, the speed limit was increased to 120 km/h. The Cashel bypass opened initially with at-grade roundabouts at both ends. When the Cashel to Mitchelstown scheme opened in July 2008, the southern end of the bypass was fused with the northern end of that scheme by removing the at-grade roundabout and replacing it with a new extended dumbbell interchange. The same happened at its northern end when the Cashel to Cullahill project was built. The Cashel Bypass was built by Roadbridge Ltd.

=== Fermoy Bypass ===
Construction of this 17.5 km (11 mi) tolled scheme started in June 2004 and was completed on 2 October 2006. This was the first stretch of actual M8 to open in the country (the Cashel bypass opened as standard DC in 2004 before its motorway redesignation in mid-2008). The section was built by Direct Route, who continue to operate and maintain it.

=== Cashel-Mitchelstown ===
Construction of this 37 km (23 mi) length of motorway started in May 2006. It was fully opened with a 100 km/h speed limit on 25 July 2008, some 10 months ahead of schedule. Twelve kilometres (7 miles) of the scheme had already opened nine months prior to this. This previously opened stretch, located between Cahir and Cashel, runs between junctions 9 and 10, and opened as a High Quality Dual Carriageway (HQDC) section of the then N8 with green signage. The green signage was replaced with blue motorway signage in September 2008 in preparation for the motorway redesignation changeover, which came into effect on 24th of that month. The scheme was built by Roadbridge Sisk JV.

=== Cashel-Cullahill ===
Construction of this 40 km (25 mi) stretch started in October 2006 and was opened to traffic on 8 December 2008, some seven months ahead of the target completion date. Like four of the other M8 schemes, the section was originally to open as HQDC with green signage and a 100 km/h speed limit. However, due to its redesignation as motorway in September 2008 it opened with full motorway restrictions, appropriate blue signage and other standard motorway features (emergency telephones, etc.). The scheme was built by Roadbridge Sisk JV at a cost of €434 million.

=== Mitchelstown-Fermoy ===
Construction of this 16 km (10 mi) scheme started in December 2007. The section opened to traffic on 25 May 2009, some nine months ahead of the original target completion date. Like the Cashel-Cullahill project, the Fermoy-Mitchelstown scheme was redesignated a motorway during its construction, having originally been envisaged as a HQDC. It was built by Roadbridge Ltd. at a cost of €174 million.

=== Cullahill-Portlaoise ===
This section of the M8 was the penultimate part of the motorway to enter the construction phase, in June 2007. At 4pm on 28 May 2010 it was the final section of the Dublin-Cork interurban route to open. The contractor building the scheme was Portlaoise Joint Venture (PJV), which was acquired by BAM before the project's completion. The scheme drew national attention during the preliminary archaeological investigations in January 2006 when over 500 human skeletons from the seventh century were discovered at the townland of Parknahown just south of Cullahill. A proposed local access junction, which would have been numbered '2' on the M8's junction numbering scheme, was eliminated from the final design by the Irish planning board to enable construction of full movement access between the M8 and the M7 at a future date if required. The road is under the management of Midlink M7/M8 Ltd, and cost €491 million to construct.

== Junctions ==
County	km	mi	Junction	Destinations	Notes
County Laois	7.5	4.7	3	R433 – Rathdowney, Abbeyleix, Durrow	Manor Stone Service Station; Continues to join M7.
County Kilkenny	25	15.5	4	R693 – Kilkenny R639 – Urlingford, Johnstown	
County Tipperary	36	22.4	5	N75 ‒ Thurles, Twomileborris	Northbound entrance and southbound exit only.
County Tipperary	43	26.7	6	N62 – Thurles, Horse and Jockey, Littleton, Holycross	
County Tipperary	54	33.5	7	R639 – Cashel, Dundrum	
County Tipperary	58	36	8	R692 – Cashel, Fethard, Clonmel	
County Tipperary	59.5	36.9	9	N74 – Tipperary, Cashel, Holycross, Dundrum (northbound); Tipperary, Cashel, New Inn (southbound)	
County Tipperary	71	44.1	10	N24 – Limerick, Waterford, New Inn (northbound); Limerick, Tipperary, Waterford, Clonmel (southbound)	
County Tipperary	79	49.1	11	R639 – Cahir	
County Cork	96	59.6	12	N73 – Mitchelstown, Kilbeheny, Mallow	
County Cork	103	64	13	R639 – Mitchelstown, Limerick, Tipperary (northbound); Mitchelstown (southbound)	
County Cork	111.5	69.2	14	R639 – Fermoy, Kilworth, Dungarvan	Fermoy Service Area
County Cork	117.5	73	15	R639 – Fermoy, Rathcormac	
County Cork	125	77.6	16	R446 ‒ Rathcormac	Northbound exit and southbound entrance only.
County Cork	128	79.5	M8 Fermoy Bypass Toll		
County Cork	130.5	81	17	R639 – Watergrasshill	
County Cork	137	85.1	18	R639 – Glanmire	
County Cork	143.5	89.1	19 Dunkettle Interchange	N25 – Waterford R623 – Little Island, Cork N40 Cork South Ring Road	Continues as N8 to Cork city centre.
1.000 mi = 1.609 km; 1.000 km = 0.621 mi: Incomplete access; Tolled; Route transition

=== Motorway service areas ===
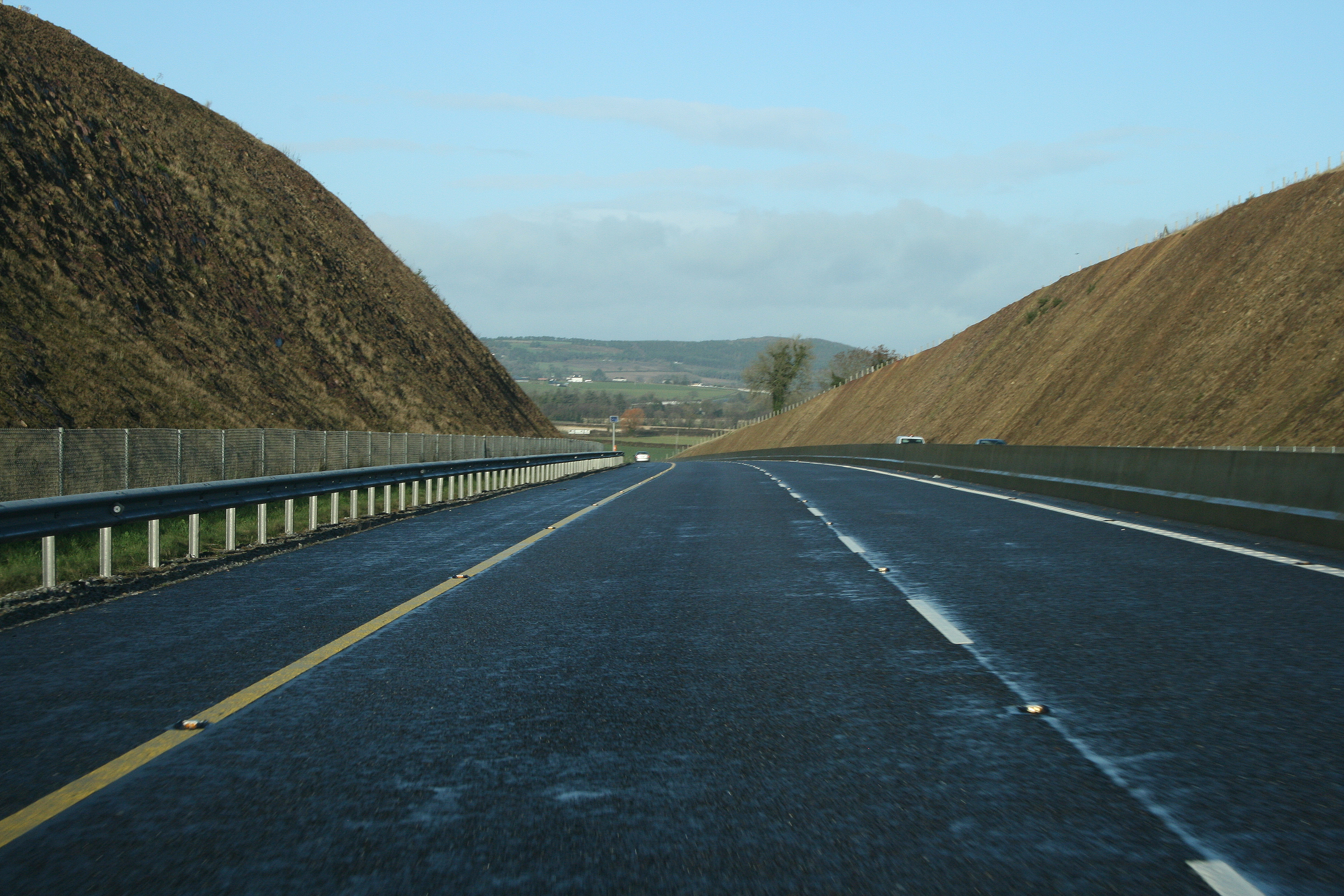
The Fermoy Bypass in County Cork

Transport Infrastructure Ireland (TII) is constructing motorway service areas at approximately 60-kilometre (40 mile) intervals along each of Ireland's interurban routes. Under this plan, the M8 currently has three such areas. The first is located at junction 3, the second at junction 8 and the third at junction 14. The Environmental Impact Statement (EIS) for the service area near Cashel was published in mid-February 2009, while the Notice of the Compulsory Purchase of land for the service area was advertised on 31 August 2010. The service area at Cashel opened on 9 June 2011.

The Manor Stone service area at Ballacolla, County Laois opened in 2015.

The EIS for the final service area near Fermoy was published in 2014. This service area opened on 30 March 2018.

== Roadside art on M8 ==
Roadside art is funded under the Percentage For Arts Scheme where 1% of the scheme budget is allocated to roadside art with a cap of €63,000. The local authorities decide on a theme and are responsible for commissioning the work, usually by open competition. There are several examples along the M8.

- Na hArd Rithe – on the Cashel bypass stand metal figures representing the High Kings of Munster. Artist Orla de Bri created (2004) these figures of gold, bronze, steel and cement.

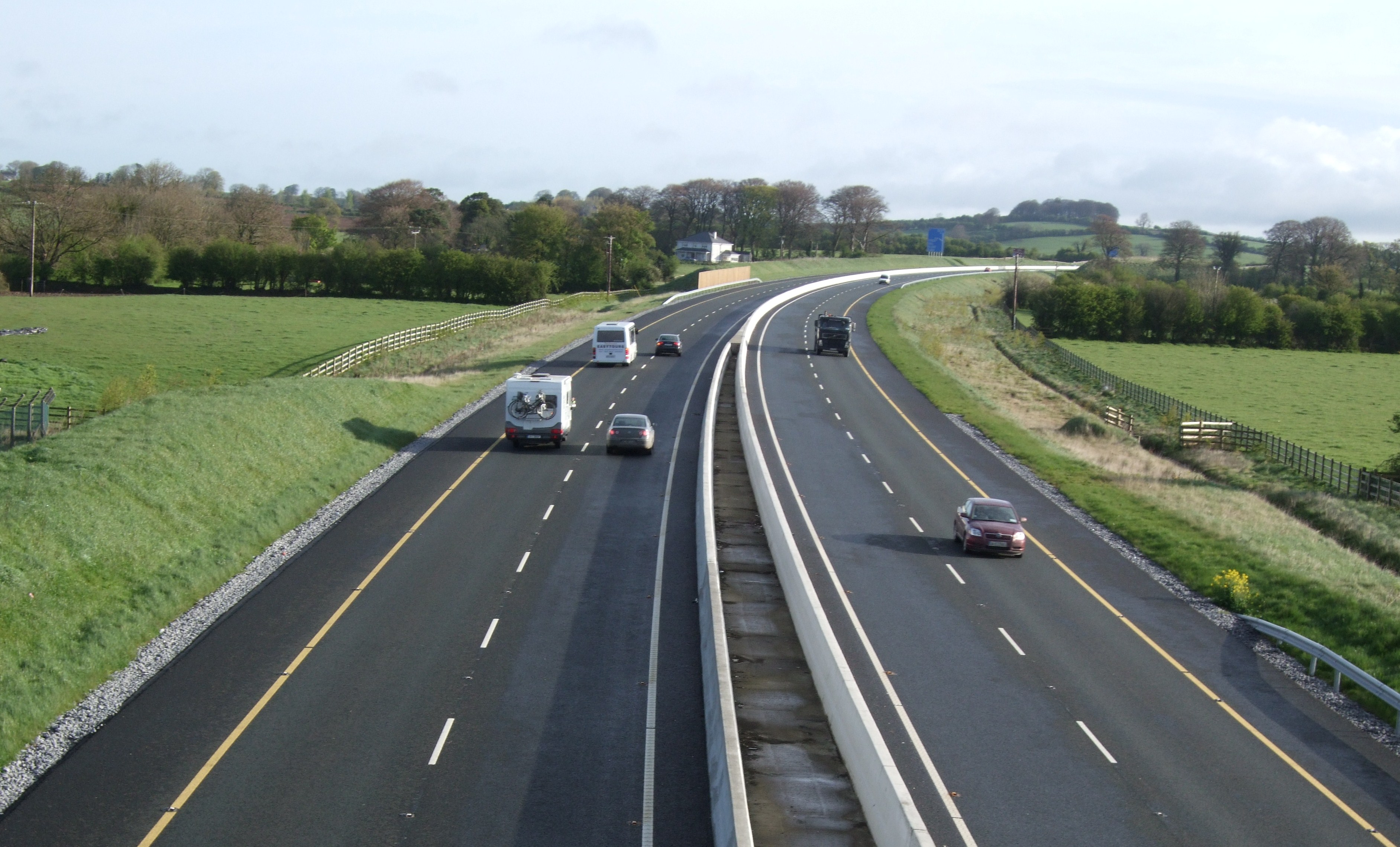
The M8 south of Junction 9, County Tipperary.

== Future ==
=== In planning ===
==== N40 North Ring Road link-up ====
Transport Infrastructure Ireland published a proposal to link the M8 at junction 18 with the proposed N40 'North Ring Road' for Cork city in late 2008. The proposed junction, which would be free-flow in both directions, would effectively convert the M8 between junctions 18 and 19 into one segment of the envisaged 360-degree ring road around inner Cork City.

== See also ==
- Roads in Ireland
- Motorways in the Republic of Ireland
- National primary road
- National secondary road
- Trunk roads in Ireland
- History of roads in Ireland
- National Development Plan
- Transport 21
