= N75 road (Ireland) =

Road in Ireland

N75 road
- Bóthar N75
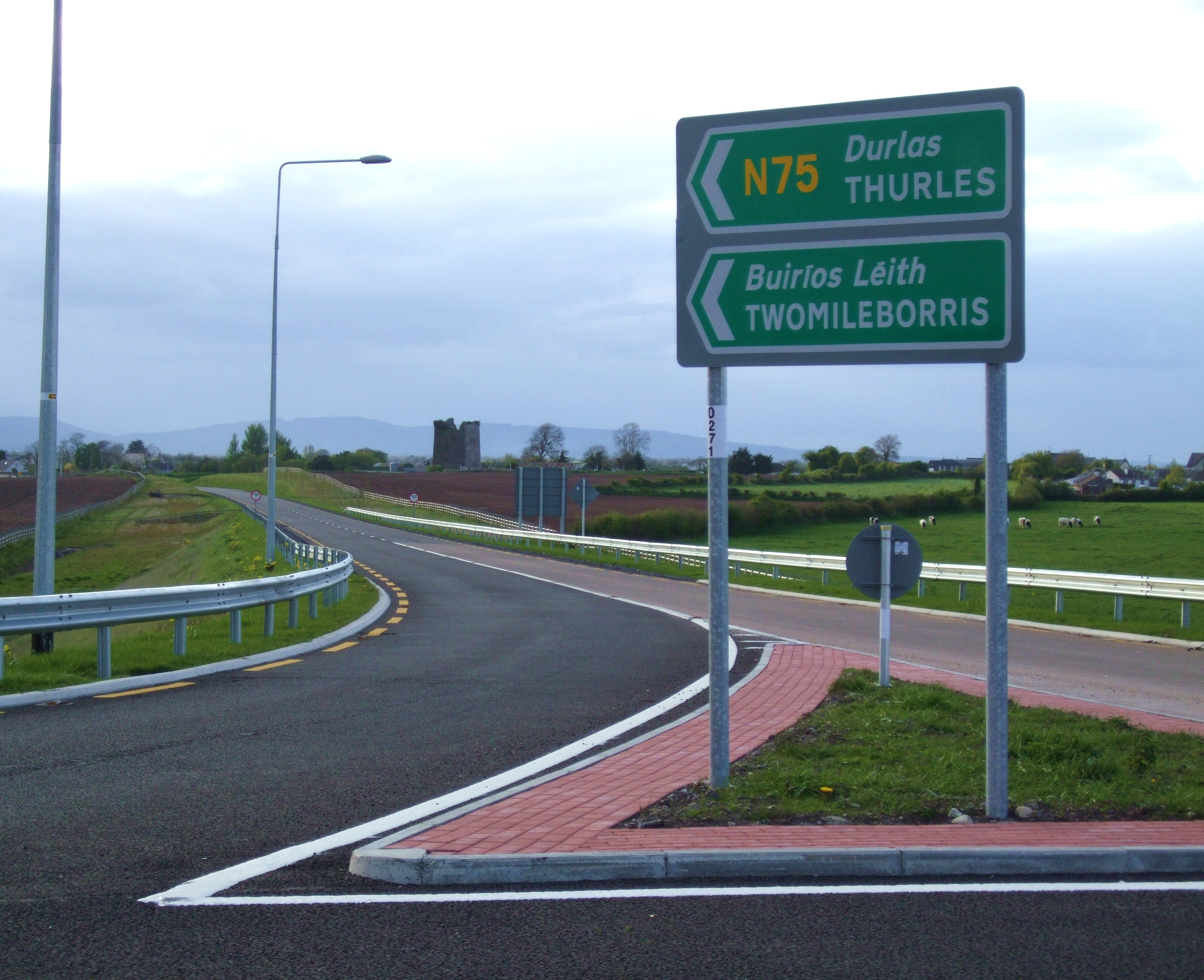
- N75 close to its junction with the M8

Route information
- Length: 7.552 km (4.693 mi)

Location
- Country: Ireland
- Primary destinations: County Tipperary; Thurles; Two-Mile Borris; M8 motorway

Highway system
- Roads in Ireland; Motorways; Primary; Secondary; Regional

The N75 road is a national secondary road in Ireland. It runs for its entire length in County Tipperary, east to west from Thurles to its junction with the M8 motorway close to the village of Two-Mile Borris.

The N75 is only 7.552 km (4.693 mi) in length.

== History ==
Prior to the opening of the Cashel-Cullahill section of the M8, the N75 passed through Two-Mile Borris, connecting to the N8 (now R639).

== See also ==
- Roads in Ireland
- Motorways in Ireland
- National primary road
- Regional road
