= Glengarra Wood =

Woodland area in Ireland

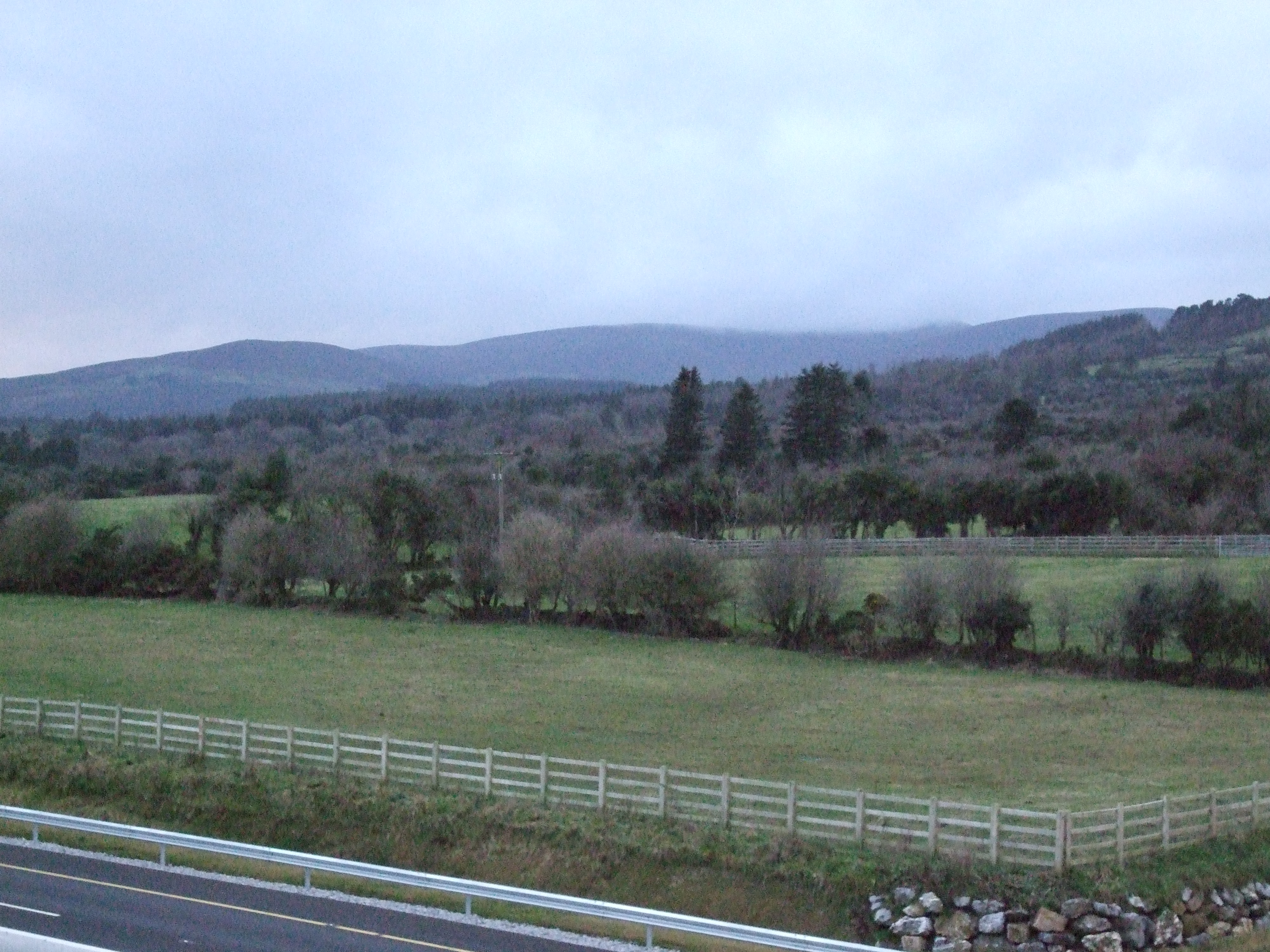
- Part of Glengarra Wood, December 2008.

- Location within Ireland
- Location: County Tipperary, Ireland
- Nearest city: Cahir
- Coordinates: 52.32025°N 8.10341°W
- Area: 570 ha (1,400 acres)

Glengarra Wood is a mixed woodland in Ireland located 15 kilometres (9.3 mi) southwest of Cahir, County Tipperary off the M8 motorway and R639 road. Approximately 570 hectares (1,400 acres) in extent, it is situated on Old Red Sandstone on the southern slopes of the Galtee Mountains. It is mainly a coniferous forest with Sitka spruce being the main species. Other conifer species present include Scots pine, Japanese larch, Douglas fir, Norway spruce, western hemlock and western red cedar. The area also contains approximately 50 hectares (120 acres) of native oak, birch and alder. Animals present include fallow deer, foxes, badgers, hares and red squirrels. Birds include pheasants, hawks, kestrels, ravens, herons and many song birds.

== History ==
Glengarra property was formerly part of the Shanbally Estate, between Burncourt and Clogheen, which was owned by Viscount Lismore. During the 19th century he built a lodge (which is now An Óige youth hostel ) about 3 kilometres (1.9 mi) up from the main road. He planted the area along the river and road leading to the lodge with many native and exotic trees. Some of those that are still present are cedars of Lebanon, Sequoiadendron, spruces, pines, laurel and a variety of arboreal rhododendron. Glengarra Wood is a Millennium Forest Project site. A number of these projects were developed in the Irish countryside in the year 2000 as part of a government initiative to plant one native tree for every household in Ireland. The Glengarra project is 15 hectares (37 acres) in size and contains approximately 60,000 trees, mainly oak with some birch, alder and Scots pine as well.

== Public amenity ==
There are two waymarked trails on the site. A 2-kilometre (1.2 mi) loop walk starts at a car park and is waymarked in red. It goes across a river and through many different stands of trees, back over the river again, down a forest road, in through more forest before ending back at the car park. The Millennium Walk, which is about 7 kilometres (4.3 mi) long, commences at the top of the car park and is signposted by stakes with a green arrow and oak leaf on them. There is a small car park about 1 kilometre (0.6 mi) up the road to the An Óige Hostel which contains signage and information on the Millennium Forest. It stretches from about 120 metres (390 ft) to about 300 metres (980 ft) above sea level and there are a number of viewing points looking south to the lowland Golden Vale and the Knockmealdown Mountains.
