= R639 road (Ireland) =

Road in Ireland

R639 road
- Bóthar R639

Location
- Country: Ireland

Highway system
- Roads in Ireland; Motorways; Primary; Secondary; Regional

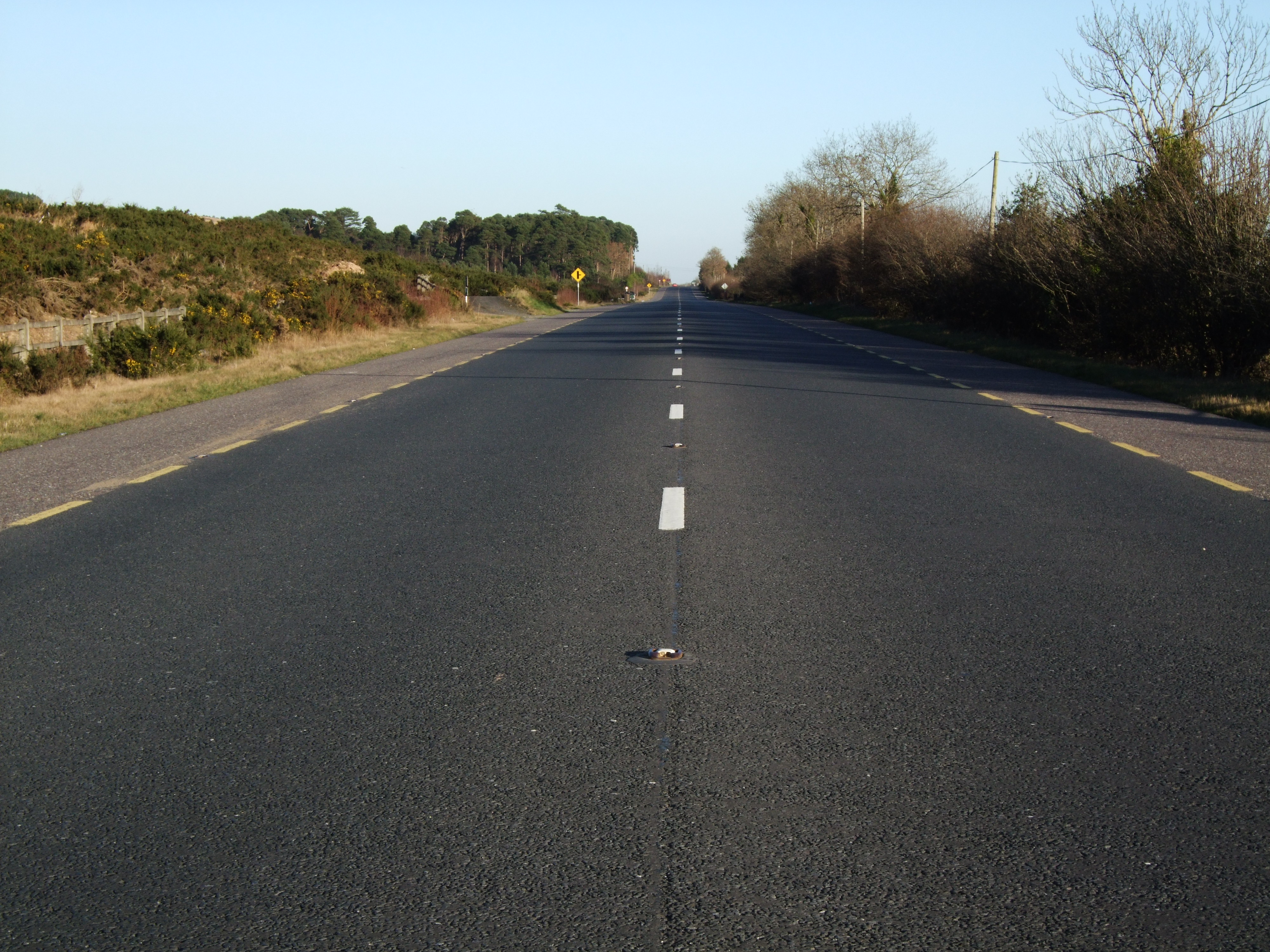
The R639 between Cahir and Skeheenarinky, built after 1811.

The R639 road is one of Ireland's regional roads. Once designated the N8 national primary road (and before that some fractions were designated as the T6 and others as the T9), it was reclassified in stages as the R639 following the progressive opening of sections of the M8 motorway, which rendered the single carriageway N8 redundant as a national primary road. By-passed sections of the old N8 were generally reclassified as R639 as soon as a new section of M8 opened, thereby increasing the length of the R639. With the completion of the M8 on 28 May 2010, the R639 now stretches from Durrow, County Laois to Cork, running through counties Laois, Kilkenny, Tipperary, Limerick and Cork.

== Route ==
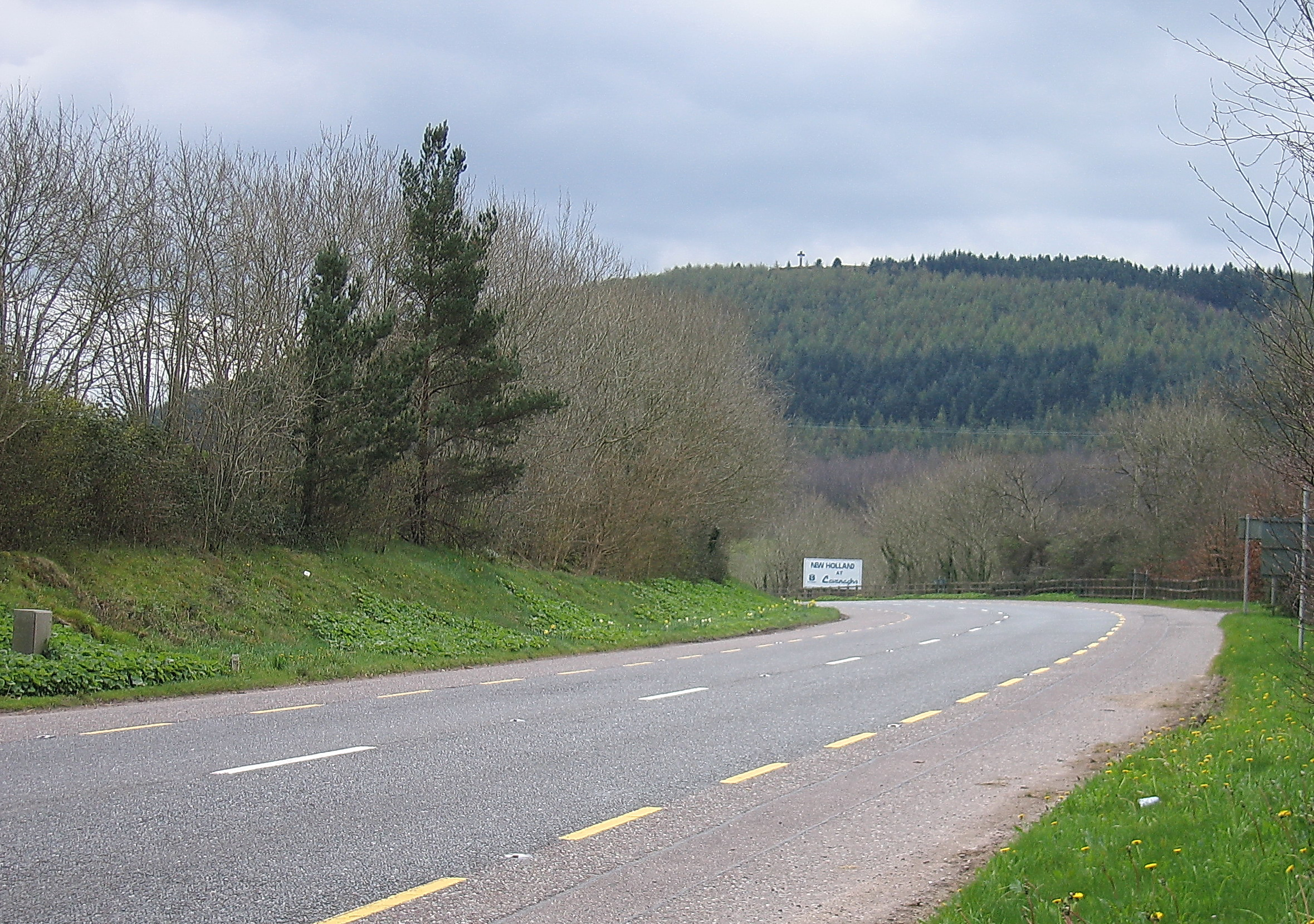
The R639 leaving Fermoy heading south

The R639 runs parallel to the M8 from its junction with the N77 in Durrow in County Laois to the N8 on the Lower Glanmire Road 1.5 km west of the Dunkettle Interchange on the outskirts of Cork City. North to south, it passes through Durrow, Cullahill, Johnstown, Urlingford, Littleton, Horse and Jockey, Cashel, and New Inn; and from there it runs south-west around Cahir and on through Skeheenarinky before entering County Limerick and passing through the village of Kilbeheny before veering west of Mitchelstown and proceeding south along Kilworth Mountain and through Fermoy, Rathcormack, Watergrasshill, Sallybrook and Glanmire, terminating at the N8 Lower Glanmire Road.

The official description of the R639 from the Roads Act 1993 (Classification of Regional Roads) Order 2012 reads:

R639: Durrow, County Laois – Cashel – Caher, County Tipperary – Mitchelstown – Fermoy – Dunkettle, County Cork (Part Old National Route 8)

Between its junction with the N77 at Mary Street Durrow in the county of Laois and its junction with N74 at Owen’s and Bigg’s Lot in the county of South Tipperary via Castle Street and Patrick Street at Durrow; and Cullahill in the county of Laois: Coolnacrutta; Chapel Street, The Square and Urlingford Road at Johnstown; Mountfin and Main Street at Urlingford in the county of Kilkenny: Fennor in the county of South Tipperary: Longfordpass Bridge at the boundary between the county of South Tipperary and the county of North Tipperary: Turnpike, Littleton and Horse and Jockey in the county of North Tipperary: Ballytarsna, Gortmakellis and Corralough in the county of South Tipperary: Dublin Road, Ladywell Street, Canopy Street, Bank Place, Main Street and Lower Gate Street in the town of Cashel: and Spafield in the county of South Tipperary

and

between its junction with N74 at Owen’s and Bigg’s Lot and its junction with N24 at Cloghabreedy via Racecourse Cross and New Inn all in the county of South Tipperary

and

between its junction with N24 at Ballydrehid in the county of South Tipperary and its junction with N73 at Carrigane in the county of Cork via Lissava, Kilcoran and Skeheenaranky in the county of South Tipperary: Brackbaun Bridge at the boundary between the county of South Tipperary and the county of Limerick: Kilbehenny in the county of Limerick: Kilbehenny Bridge at the boundary between the county of Limerick and the county of Cork

and

between its junction with N73 at Stag Park in the county of Cork and its junction with N72 at Church Place in the town of Fermoy via Gortnahown, Monadrishane and Gortore in the county of Cork: and Oliver Plunket Hill in the town of Fermoy

and

between its junction with N72 at Pearse Square in the town of Fermoy and its junction with the N8 at Lota More in the county of Cork via McCurtain Street, McDonagh Terrace and Cork Road in the town of Fermoy: Rathcormack, Curraghprevin, Skahanagh North, Watergrasshill, Annacarton Bridge, Killydonoghoe, Ballincrossig and Glanmire in the county of Cork.

== History ==
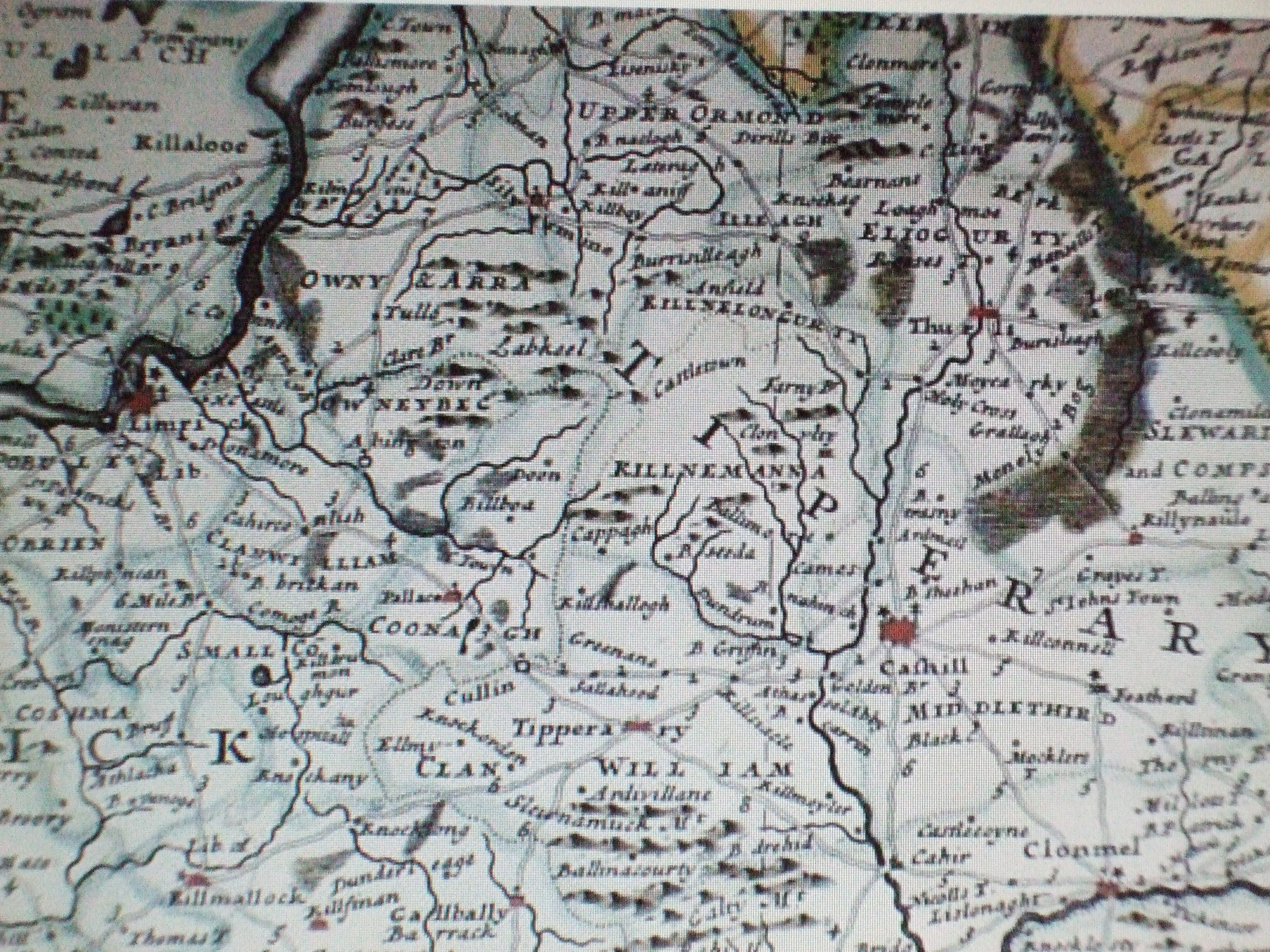
Tipperary, as shown in Herman Moll's New Map of Ireland (1714). The present R639 may be discerned between Cahir and Cashel only; it existed neither south of Cahir nor north of Cashel at this time.

=== 18th and 19th centuries ===
In the 17th, 18th and early to mid-19th centuries – and probably earlier still – horse-drawn Dublin-Cork traffic travelled via Kilcullen, Carlow, Kilkenny, Clonmel, Ardfinnan, Clogheen, Ballyporeen, Kilworth, Fermoy and Rathcormac. Much of the R639/N8 route was built to connect the midlands to southern Tipperary and north County Cork as part of the Irish turnpike road-building drive of the mid-18th century. However, some sections are considerably older, such as the segment between Cork and Fermoy, and that between Cashel and Cahir; the construction of these particular stretches cannot as yet be dated, though they were in place prior to 1714. The R639/N8 between Fermoy and Cahir via Mitchelstown was built sometime after 1811, while the R639 between Cashel and Urlingford was built around 1739. At the same time, the route from Urlingford to Maryboro (modern-day Portlaoise) was substantially improved. In 1782 an unnamed English tourist in Ireland, known to historians as "X.Z.", gave a brief description of the route between Cashel and Urlingford: "From Cashel we rode fifteen miles of a bad road, through a bleak country to Urlingford, when we enter Leinster province. The country now becomes more populous, better improved, and the roads much more agreeable for travelling."

=== 20th and 21st centuries ===
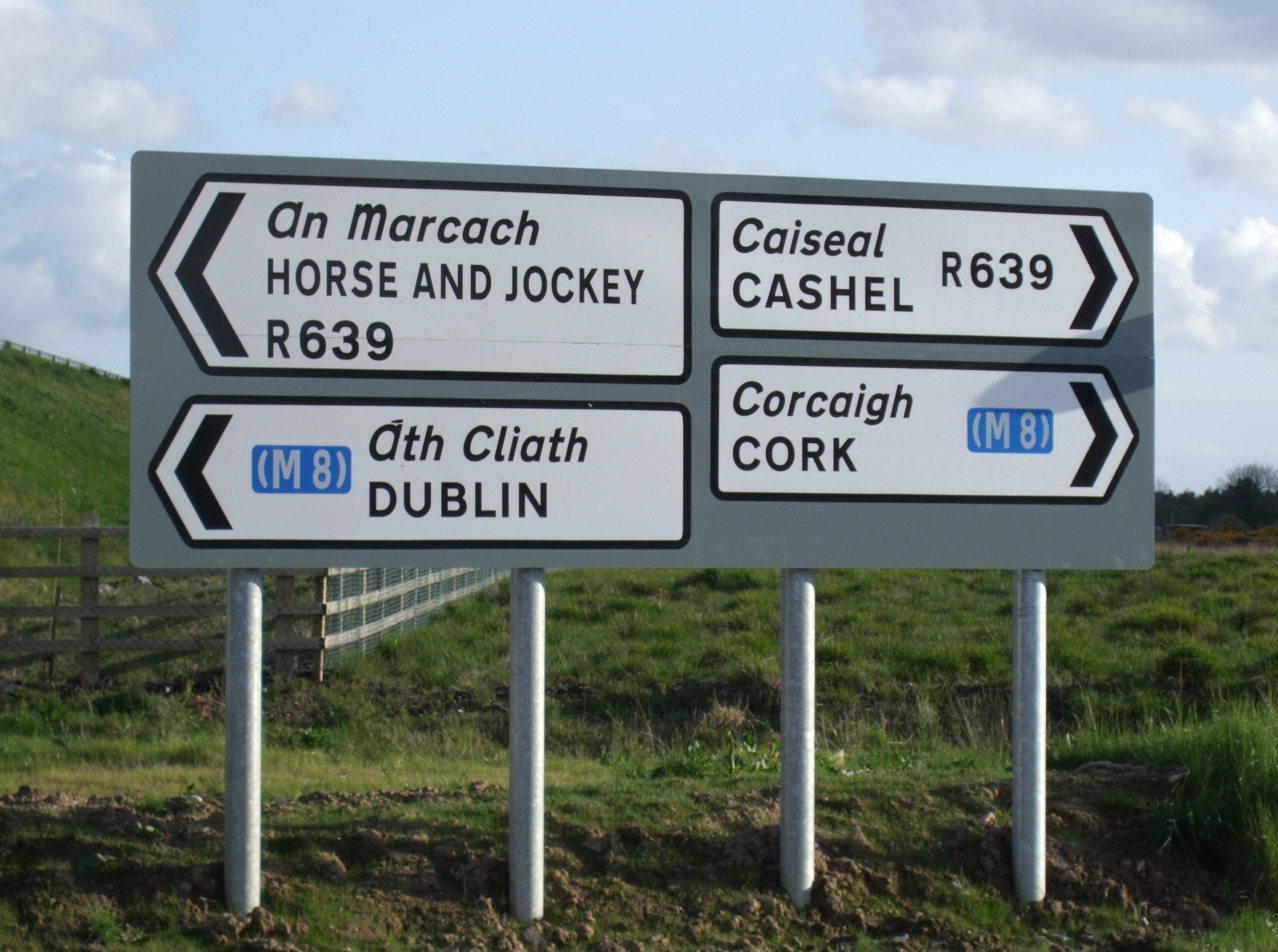
Contemporary signage on the R639.

Some time after 1811 the gaps in the R639 between Fermoy and Cahir were filled, but the traditional Cork to Dublin route, known for much of the 20th century as the T6, continued to run from Cork to Cahir, and from there to Dublin via Clonmel, Kilkenny and Carlow. The R639/N8 corridor did not become the official Dublin to Cork road until 1974, though several Esso road atlases considered it to be the preferred route for motorists travelling between the two cities from at least the early 1960s. From this time until the gradual opening of the various M8 motorway segments beginning with the Fermoy Bypass in 2006, the route was known as the "N8".

The N8 was improved at various times during the 1970s through to the early years of the 21st century. One of the first improvements entailed a realignment of the road so that it bypassed the village of Glanmire for 6 km to the east. This dual carriageway bypass, referred to in official documentation as the "Glanmire Bypass", opened in April 1992 after a construction period of almost 7 years. When this happened, the former T6/N8 through Glanmire was renumbered, for the first time, as the "R639". The next major incident in the modern history of the R639 occurred in 1991, when a new 4 km single-carriageway bypass to the south-west of Cahir in County Tipperary opened to traffic. This bypass became a part of the N8 for the next 18 years. With the completion of the M8 motorway through South Tipperary in July 2008 however, the 1991 N8 Cahir Bypass was renumbered as part of the N24 – while simultaneously becoming the R639. (The original route of the N8 through Cahir town was redesignated a regional road in 1991, and made a part of the R670.) Other improvement projects carried out on the road during the 1970s, 80s and 90s involved periodic widening and resurfacing. In spring 2001, attention was turned to Watergrasshill in County Cork. For many years regarded as a serious bottleneck on the N8, a wide median 7 km dual carriageway bypass was constructed and opened to traffic in September 2003 as the N8, with the former road through Watergrasshill becoming the R639. In 2004 the N8 through Cashel in County Tipperary was realigned with a narrow-median dual carriageway bypass to the east of that town. Again, the former N8 through Cashel was redesignated a regional road, and renumbered the R639. In October 2007 the section of N8 between Cashel and Cahir (the same road mapped by Herman Moll in 1714) was bypassed by an early-opening segment of the M8 motorway, and became the most recent addition to the R639 route. This, in turn, was followed in July 2008 by the section between Cahir and Kilbehenny; on 8 December 2008 by the length of road from Cashel to 2 km south of Cullahill in County Laois; on 25 May 2009, by the section between Mitchelstown and Fermoy; and on 28 May 2010 by the length between Durrow and Cullahill.

== Landmarks ==
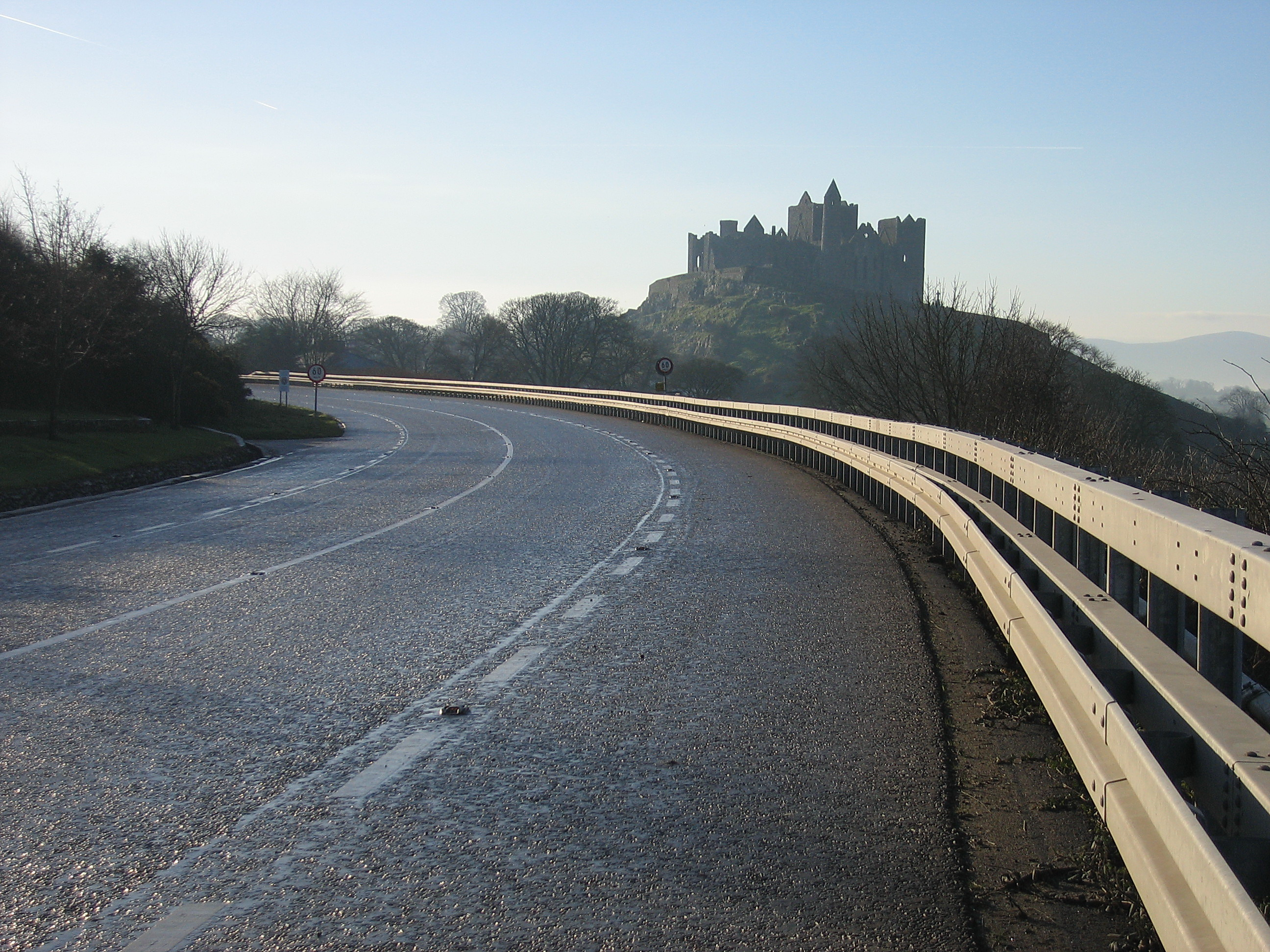
The R639 approaching Cashel from the north

The road offers a striking view of the Rock of Cashel and famously skirts around its base on its approach to Cashel town. Visible from the R639 too is Hoare Abbey, also close to Cashel. South of Cahir the R639 passes southwest along the base of the Galtee Mountains, while to the east, the fertile plain of the Golden Vale is observable, with the Knockmealdowns and Comeragh Mountains starkly visible to the east. The R639 also passes by Glengarra Wood and Mitcheltown Cave.

== See also ==
- Roads in Ireland
- Motorways in the Republic of Ireland
- National primary road
- National secondary road
- History of roads in Ireland
- Trunk roads in Ireland
