= Watergrasshill =

Village in County Cork, Ireland

Watergrasshill Cnocán na Biolraí
- Village
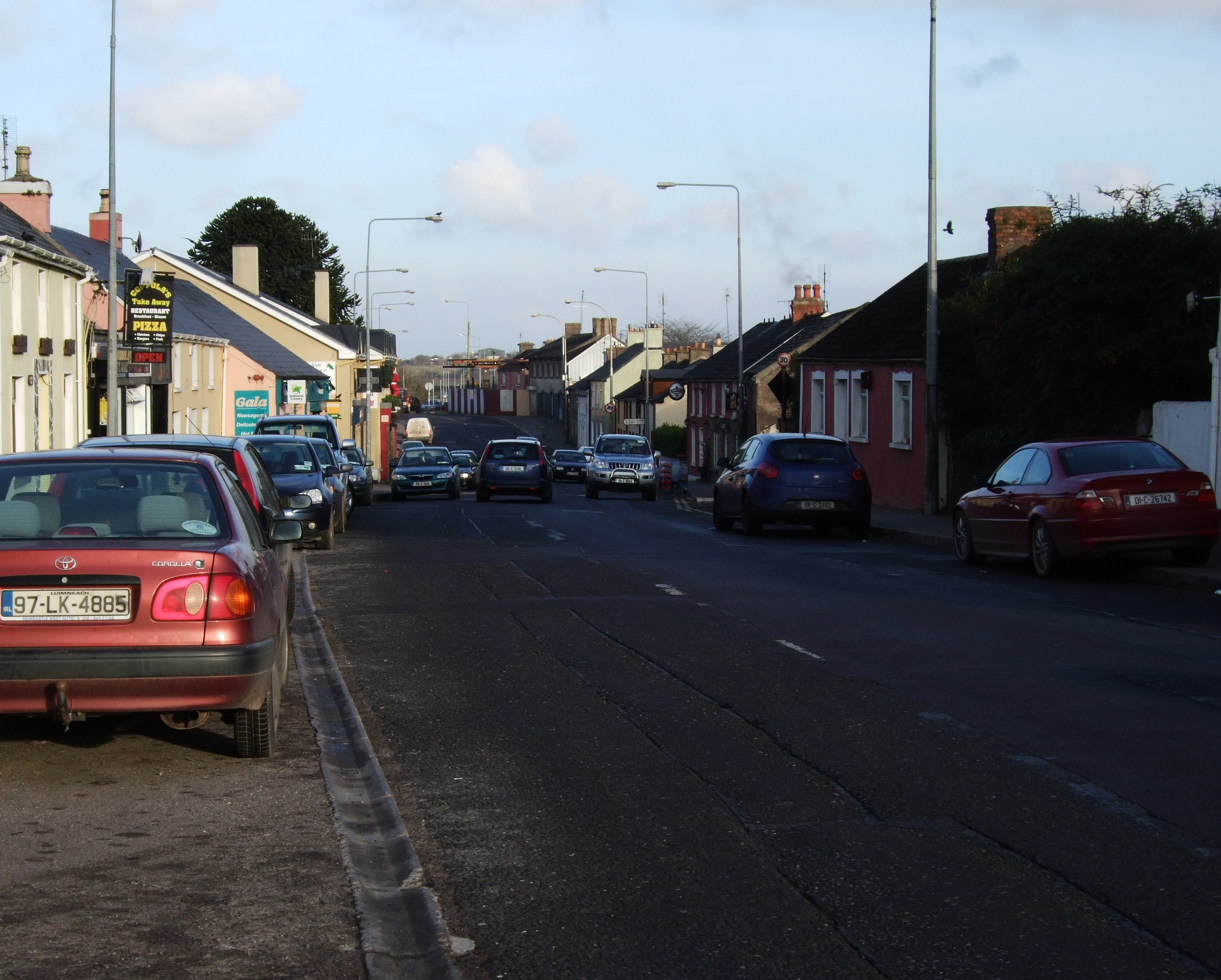
- The R639 road (main street) through Watergrasshill

- Location in Ireland
- Coordinates: 52°02′24″N 8°14′35″W
- Country: Ireland
- Province: Munster
- County: County Cork
- Barony: Barrymore
- Elevation: 184 m (604 ft)

Population (2022)
  - Total: 1,840
- Time zone: UTC+0 (WET)
  - Summer (DST): UTC-1 (IST (WEST))
- Irish Grid Reference: W762843

Watergrasshill (Irish: Cnocán na Biolraí, meaning 'watercress hillock') is a village in north-east County Cork in Ireland to the north of Cork city. It is within the Cork North-Central Dáil constituency. Bypassed in 2003, the village is situated on the R639 road and accessible via junction 17 of the M8 motorway. It had a population of 1,840 at the 2022 census.

== History ==
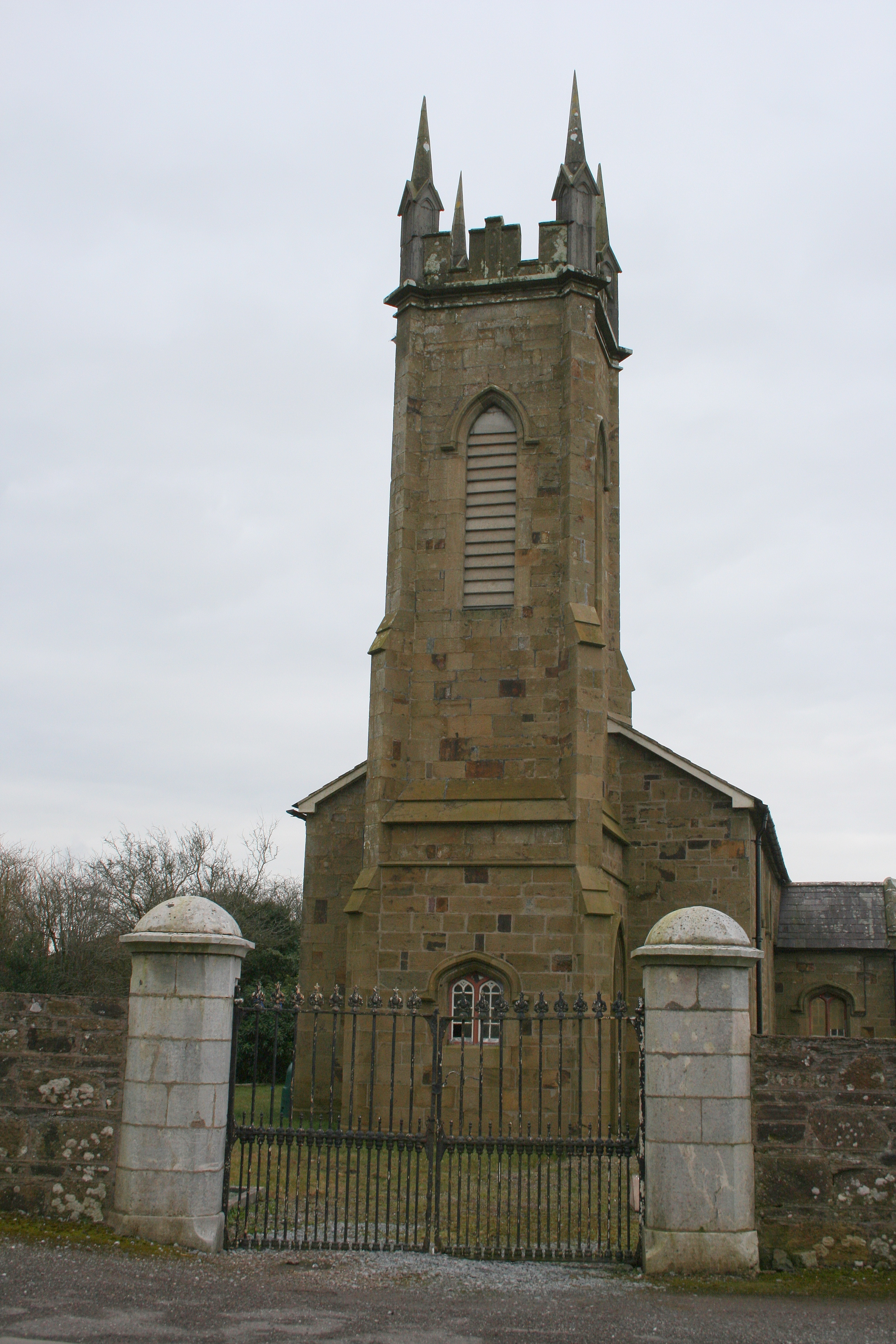
The Church of Ireland church in Watergrasshill (built c.1820) is now an arts venue

Evidence of ancient settlement in the area includes a number standing stones, fulacht fiadh, and ringfort sites in the surrounding townlands of Bishop's Island and Tinageragh. The Roman Catholic 'Church of the Immaculate Conception' was completed in 1895. The Church of Ireland church in the village was built c. 1820. This church was deconsecrated in 1990 and has since been used as an arts venue.

The National Ploughing Championships were held in the Watergrasshill area in 1974 and 1979.

== Demographics ==
According to A Topographical Dictionary of Ireland, published by Samuel Lewis in 1837, Watergrasshill then had a population of 533 people.

The village is located within the commuter area of Cork city, and in the period between the 1996 and 2022 census, the population of Watergrasshill grew more than seven-fold, from 252 to 1,840 people.

== Amenities and sport ==
Watergrasshill and its hinterland are serviced by a number of amenities, shops, bars, restaurants and a primary (national) school. As of 2018, there were approximately 370 pupils enrolled in Watergrasshill National School.

The area is home to Watergrasshill GAA (hurling) club, Watergrasshill United soccer club and Watergrasshill Athletics Club.

== See also ==
- List of towns and villages in Ireland
