= Glanmire =

Town in Cork city, Ireland

Glanmire Gleann Maghair
- Town
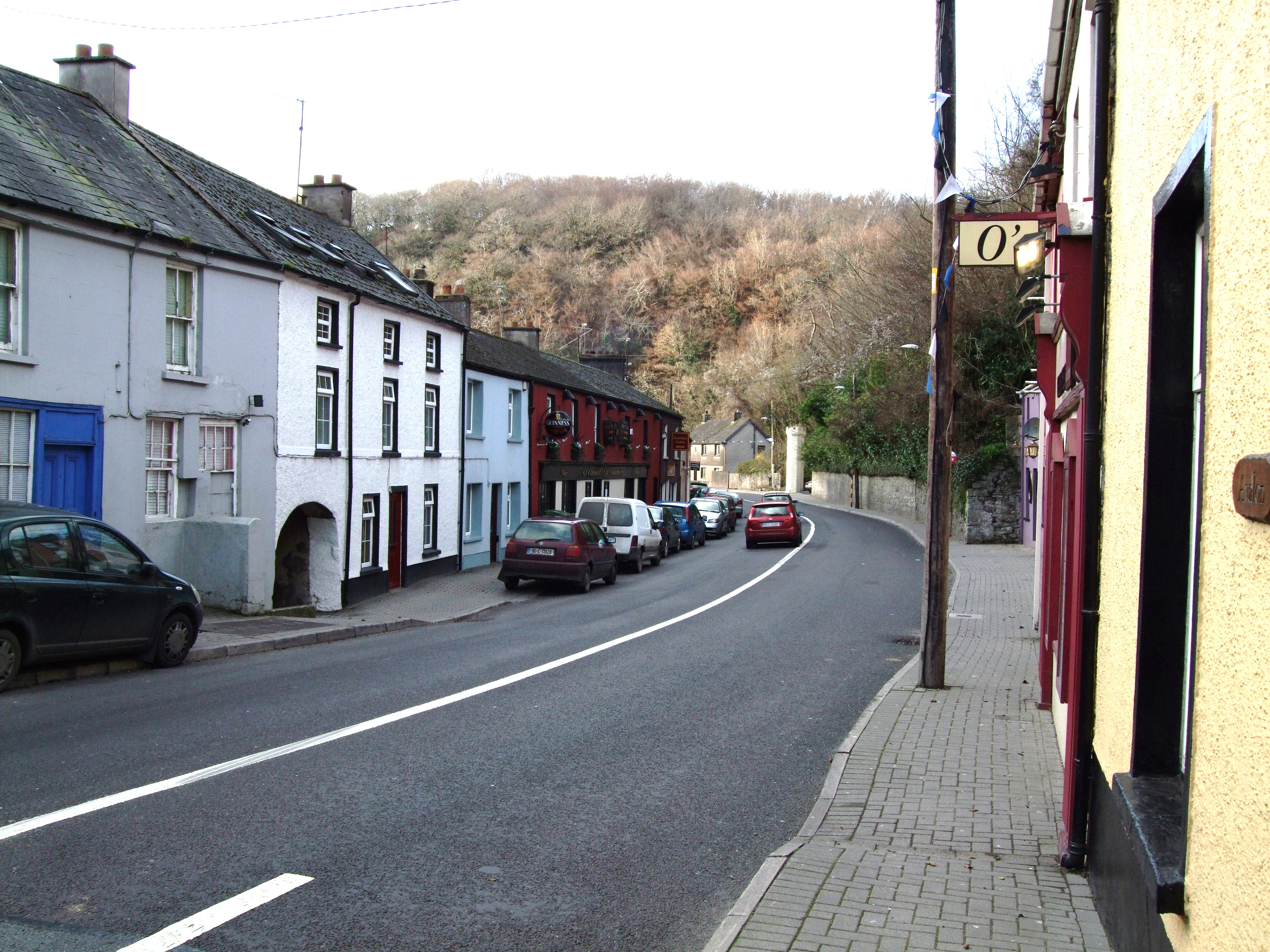
- The R639 road through Glanmire

- Location in Ireland
- Coordinates: 51°55′N 8°24′W
- Country: Ireland
- Province: Munster
- City: Cork

Government
  - Type: Cork City Council
  - Dáil Éireann: Cork North-Central
- Elevation: 44 m (144 ft)

Population (2022)
  - Estimate: 11,296
- Time zone: UTC+0 (WET)
  - Summer (DST): UTC-1 (IST (WEST))

Glanmire (Irish: Gleann Maghair) is a suburban town within the administrative area of Cork city, in the civil parish of Rathcooney, County Cork, Ireland.

The greater Glanmire area encompasses the communities of Riverstown (Baile Roisín), Brooklodge (Cill Ruadháin) and Sallybrook (Sruthán na Saileach).

== History ==
Glanmire's history dates to Early Christian Ireland, with the nearby church site at Rathcooney in use since 1291. The stone bridge located in Riverstown dates to c.1760. At the parish church located on a hill above the village, Sarah Curran, lover of the hanged Robert Emmet, married Captain Henry Sturgeon in 1805.

In the 1800s, Glanmire was a small yet industrialised village with woolen factories and mills lining the banks of the river Glashaboy.

The town expanded substantially in the late 20th century. Originally administered by Cork County Council, in 2019 Glanmire, as part of the boundary expansion of the city, was brought within the administrative area of Cork City Council.

== Education ==
There are six primary schools serving the Glanmire area. These include Scoil na nÓg (An Irish Language, boarding and day boarding Primary School, founded in 1958), Scoil Naomh Micheál (Saint Michael's - Upper Glanmire), Scoil Naomh Iosaf (Saint Joseph's - Riverstown), Scoil Chill Ruadháin (Brooklodge Primary School), New Inn and Gaelscoil Uí Drisceoil which opened in 2006.

Glanmire has two secondary schools. Glanmire Community College (GCC), established in 1997, is located on a twelve-acre site. Coláiste an Phiarsaigh, opened in 1973, is located in Glanmire Village. It has around 550 students – both day students and weekly boarders. Coláiste an Phiarsaigh is part of the Gaelachas Teoranta Organisation.

== Irish language ==
There are several Irish language schools in the Glanmire area, with approximately 300 pupils attending the Gaelscoil (primary) and 550 in the Gaelcholáiste (secondary). Gaelachas Teoranta also hosts residential summer courses in Irish, and there is a "mini-Gaeltacht" in Árd Barra whose founders include musician Tomás Ó Canainn. "The Miller of Glanmire" is a jig named after the town.

== Churches ==
Glanmire Parish extends from midway on Tivoli dual carriageway to within three miles of Watergrasshill, thence to White's Cross via Templemichael.

There are two Catholic churches in the Glanmire: Saint Michael's church in Upper Glanmire and St Joseph's in Riverstown. St. Michael's was dedicated and reopened for worship in 1808 following restructuring. The bi-centenary of this church was celebrated in 2008, and a special Mass of Thanksgiving was celebrated with Bishop John Buckley as principal celebrant. St. Joseph's is the Glanmire Parish Church and was dedicated in 1837. Both St. Joseph's and St. Michael's are built on or near the sites of pre-penal times churches.

== Notable people ==
- Billy Kelleher, Member of the European Parliament
- Teddy McCarthy, Gaelic footballer and hurler
- David G. O'Connell, Auxiliary Bishop of Los Angeles
