= McMann =

McMann is a surname. Notable people with the surname include:

- Bobby McMann (born 1996), Canadian ice hockey player
- Charlene McMann (born c. 1951), American advocate
- Chuck McMann (1951–2021), Canadian football player
- Jamie McMann (1976–2025), American record producer
- Lisa McMann (born 1968), American writer
- Paul McMann, American businessman
- Sara McMann (born 1980), American wrestler
- Scott McMann (born 1996), Scottish footballer

== See also ==
- McMahon (disambiguation)
- McMahan
- McMahen
