= John James Murphy =

Irish archdeacon (1796–1883)

John James Murphy PP (1796–1883) was an Irish archdeacon.

== Early life ==
John James Murphy was born in 1796 in Ringmahon House, in Mahon, Cork, Ireland. As a youngster, Murphy inherited an interest in commercial pursuits coupled with a spirit of adventure from his father, James Murphy, founder of Murphy's Brewery. While still a boy, he took service in the Hudson's Bay Company, and lived for 12 years with a tribe of Canadian Indians who gave him the title of "Black Eagle of the North".

In 1825, Murphy returned to the United Kingdom and moved to Liverpool where entered on a commercial pursuit with his brother.

== Religion ==
In 1840, he abandoned business in order to make a pilgrimage to the Holy Land. On his way to Jerusalem, he visited Rome, and was introduced to the president of the English College. That was to be the turning point in his life. He gave up his intended pilgrimage, and began his theological studies. On 2 March 1844, he was ordained to the priesthood, having in his possession on the day of his ordination, the sum of £40,000.

== Famine ==
In 1844, Murphy returned to Liverpool as Fr. Murphy, and was inducted as priest-in-charge to the newly formed parish of St. Joseph's in the Irish quarter of the city. The famine in Ireland had already caused many of the Irish to seek refuge in Liverpool, where famine fever raged among the Irish residents. With his own money Fr. Murphy purchased a methodist chapel in the district, which he converted into a Catholic church. For three years he ministered to the spiritual and physical needs of his fellow Irish men and women.

== Return to Cork ==
In 1847, his uncle, Bishop John Murphy of Cork, died and was succeeded by Bishop William Delany, who recalled Fr. Murphy back to County Cork and appointed him as chaplain to the Presentation Sisters in Bandon. That same year, at his own request, he was transferred to Goleen (Schull). Again, out of his own resources, he provided food for the victims of the famine. In 1848 he was recalled to Cork City and appointed administrator of Ss. Peter & Paul's. His first duties as administrator was the provision of a larger church to replace the inadequate Carey's Lane Church.

== Founder ==
Fr. John Murphy contributed largely out of his own funds to build Ss. Peter and Paul's Church in 1866. In addition to this, he helped establish the Mercy Hospital in Cork, which had formerly been the Mansion House, but was then used as the Diocesan Seminary – administered by the Vincentian Fathers.

On its being turned into a hospital, the Vincentian Order founded a new home in St. Patrick's Place, which became known as St. Finbarr's Seminary. Fr. Murphy also built the Chapel and residence at the North Infirmary Hospital for the Sisters of Charity of St. Vincent de Paul.

== Death ==
Murphy died on 10 March 1883 in St. Vincent's Presbytery, Sunday's Well Road in Cork. He was buried at Carrigrohane Cemetery, Carrigrohane, County Cork.

His obituary read: His Lordship, Most Rev. Dr. Delany, Bishop of Cork, was the celebrant of the Solemn Requiem Mass; deacon was, Fr. Michael O'Flynn, C.C, Ss. Peter & Paul's; sub-deacon was, Fr. Andrew Forrest, C.C., Ss. Peter & Paul's, and master of ceremonies was, Fr. Florence McCarthy, C.C., Ss. Peter & Paul's.

== Appointments in brief ==
- Retired ex Ss. Peter & Paul's : 10/1874
- Ss. Peter & Paul's Adm : 1848 – 1874
- Schull CC : 1848 – 1848 Chaplain,
- Presentation Convent, Bandon : 1847 – 1848
- Ministry Abroad/ Liverpool : 1844 – 1847
- Appointed Archdeacon of the Diocese in July 1974.
