= Mahon, Cork =

Suburb of Cork City, Ireland

Mahon Machain
- Suburb
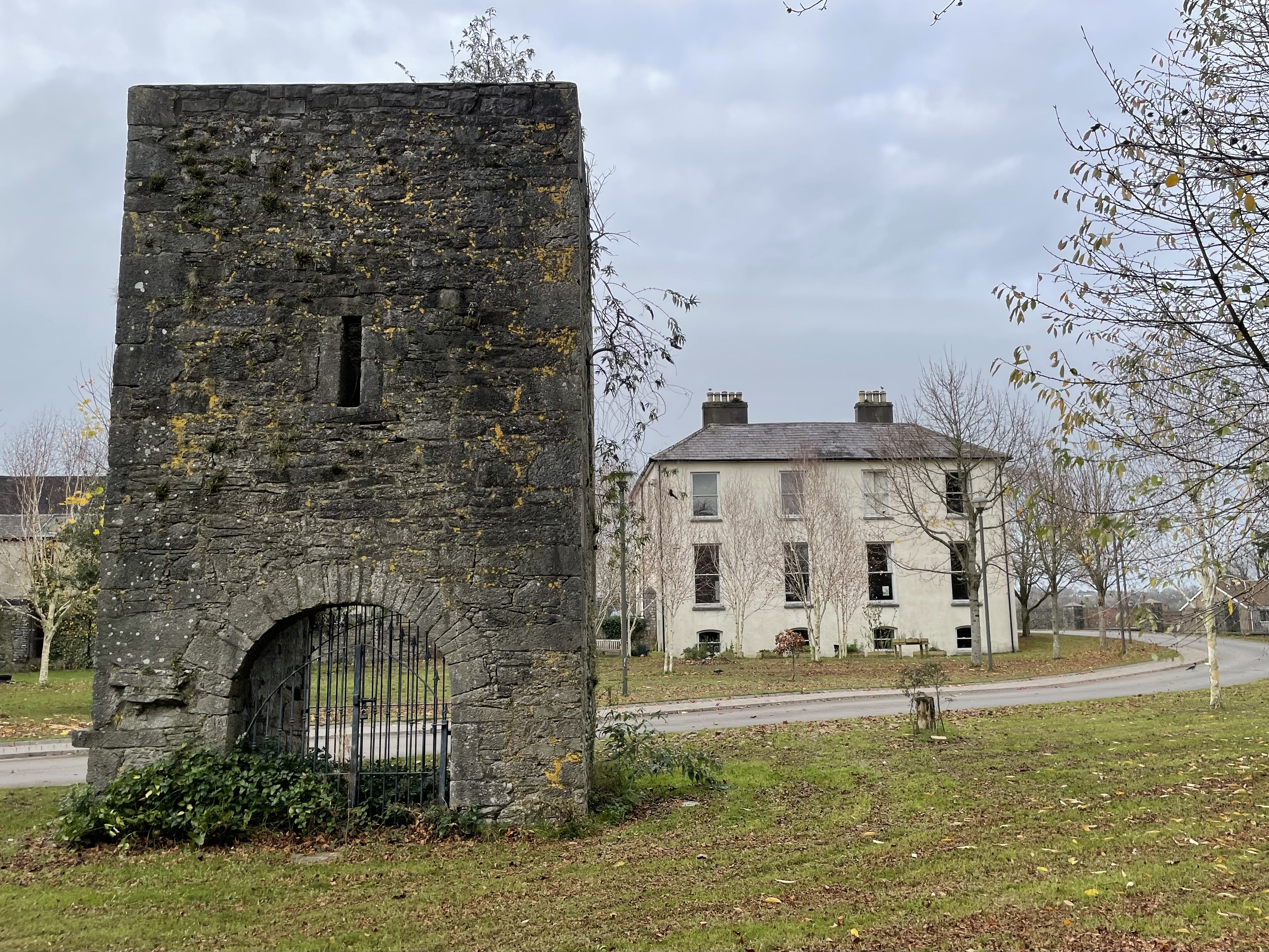
- Gate tower of Ringmahon Castle in the grounds of Ringmahon House

- Location within County Cork
- Coordinates: 51°53′21″N 8°23′50″W
- Country: Ireland
- Province: Munster
- County: Cork
- Time zone: UTC0 (WET)
  - Summer (DST): UTC+1 (IST)
- Area code: 021

Mahon (Irish: Machain) is an area to the south-eastern side of Cork, Ireland. Mahon gets its name from Lough Mahon, a wide stretch of the upper section of Cork Harbour. It was once a semi-rural peninsula, but from the late 20th century was subject to residential development, and has a number of housing estates and developments. The area was generally known as the Ring of Mahon, and is the site of Ringmahon House (formerly occupied by James Murphy of Murphy's Brewery and later by Ben Dunne of Dunnes Stores). Mahon is within the Cork South-Central Dáil constituency.

== History ==
According to John Windele's Historical and Descriptive Notices of the City of Cork and Its Vicinity (published in 1839), Ringmahon and the Mahon peninsula takes its name from the Irish word rinn (meaning peninsula) and Mahon (a reference to the O'Mahony family who controlled much of the area). Ringmahon Castle, though undated, is included in 17th century maps of the peninsula and is historically associated with the Crawford and Chatterton families. Ringmahon was leased to the Murphy family by the start of the 19th century, and James Murphy (1769–1855) built Ringmahon House c. 1820.

Blackrock Castle, also known as "Blackrock Castle Observatory", is a 16th-century castle located in nearby Blackrock, a suburb which borders Mahon. The castle is a short distance from the centre of Mahon on the banks of the River Lee, and was built by the citizens of Cork as a watch tower and fort to guard the city's waterway. In a collaboration between Cork City Council and the Cork Institute of Technology, Blackrock Castle was re-opened to the public in August 2007 as Blackrock Castle Observatory.

Also nearby is Dundanion Castle. This ruined 16th-century castle, also at Blackrock, was the point from which William Penn reputedly sailed on his first voyage to America in 1682.

== Geography ==
Lough Mahon is an expanse of approximately 12 square kilometres (4.6 sq mi) within upper Cork Harbour. It stretches from Mahon to Passage West and incorporates the estuary of the Douglas River. Several Cork City southern suburbs, including Mahon, Blackrock, Douglas and Rochestown lie along its shores. At low tide, Lough Mahon has extensive mudflats which are used as feeding grounds for a number of bird species and migrating waders in particular.

== Economy ==
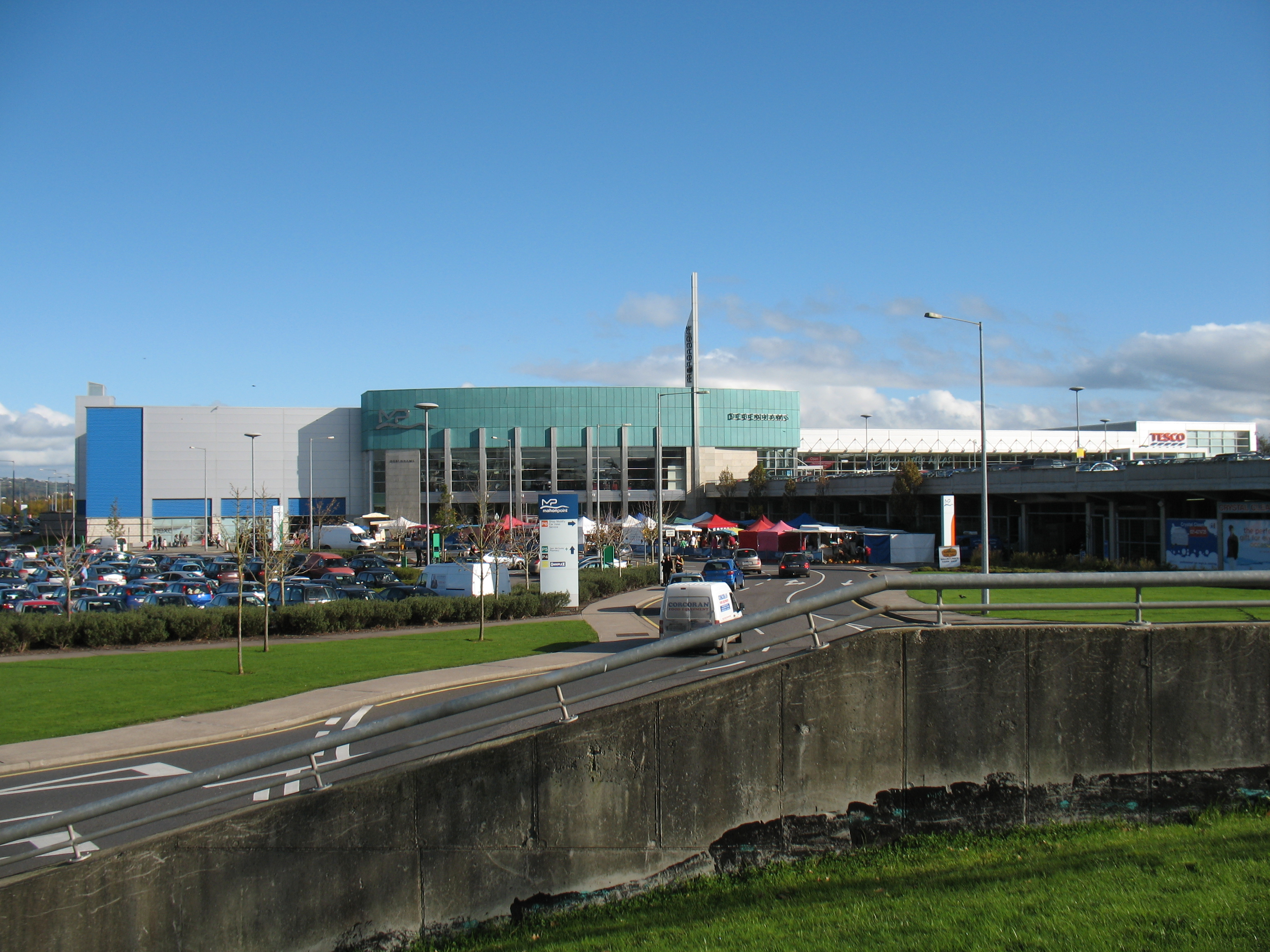
Mahon Point Shopping Centre

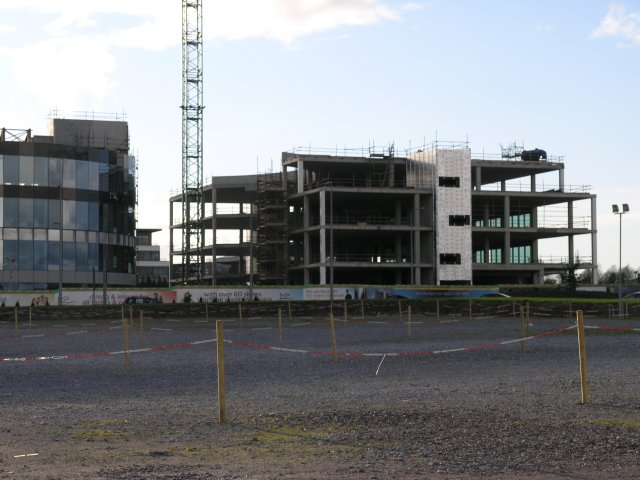
Mahon's City Gate development under construction

Mahon is located in the greater Cork area with the South Ring Road running along its eastern and southern edges and entering the Jack Lynch Tunnel under the River Lee. The road gives access to Cork Airport as well as Cork city centre. It is home to City Gate, an office and medical development. The Central Statistics Office, PM Group, and RCI are also located in the area.

The area is also home to the Mahon Point Shopping Centre, which is Cork's biggest shopping centre and retail park, and Munster's second largest shopping destination (after the Crescent Shopping Centre in Limerick). The centre has over 60 stores, a thirteen-screen cinema, and a food court. RedFM, a Cork radio station, has a broadcasting pod in the centre.

== Transport ==
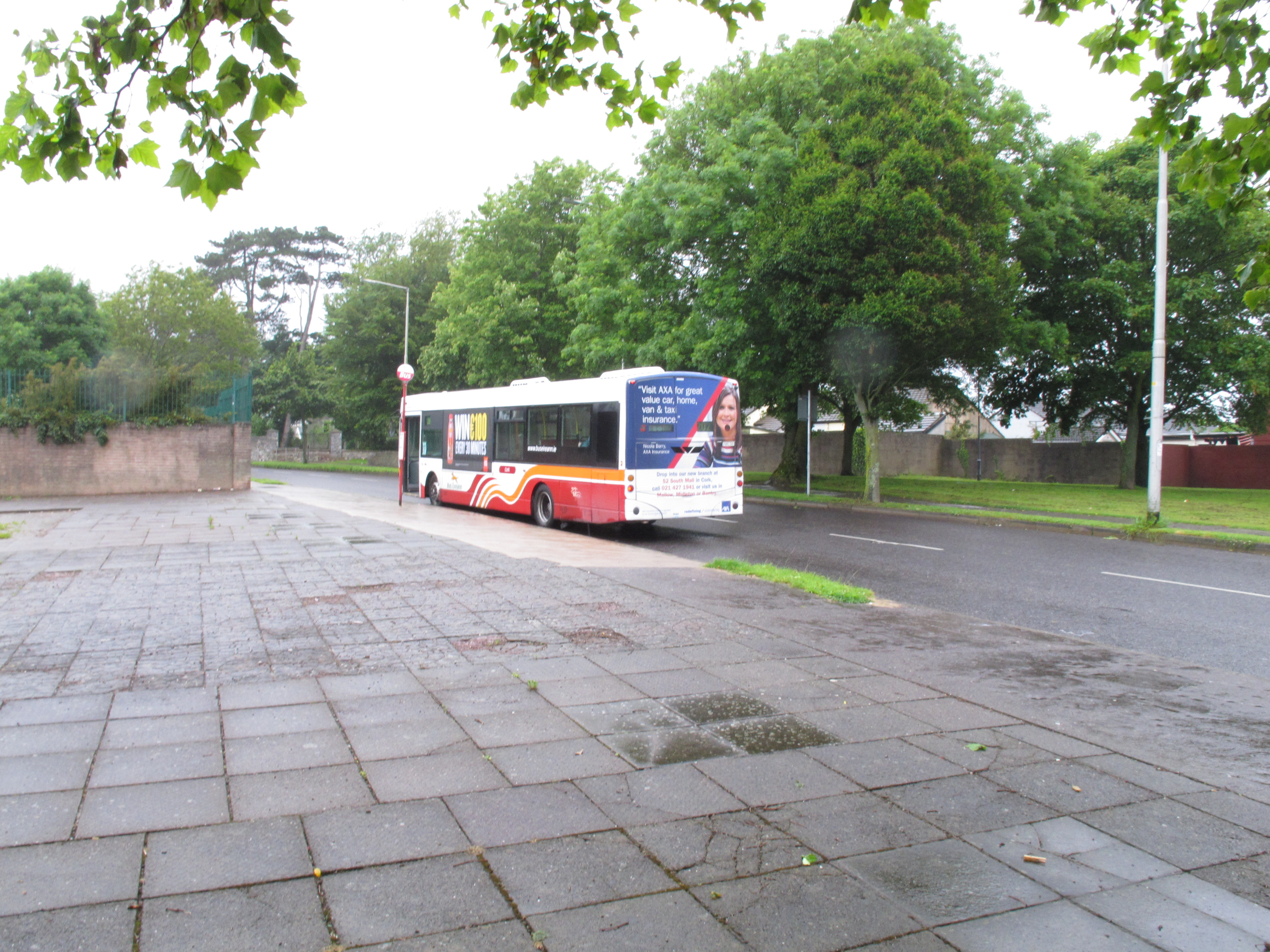
Bus stop in Mahon

By road, the Jack Lynch Tunnel crosses under the River Lee from Mahon to Dunkettle. Completed in 1999, it transports vehicular traffic in uni-directional bi-lanes. In 2015, it was estimated that approximately 63,000 vehicles were using the tunnel per day.

A walk has been developed along the old railway line from Mahon to Harty's Quay, Rochestown and from Hop Island, Rochestown to Passage West.

Bus services which serve Mahon include Bus Éireann route numbers 202 and 202A (serving Mahon via Blackrock, Ballintemple, Cork City Centre, and Gurranabraher from Knocknaheeny). The 212 operates from Mahon to Cork Kent railway station via Blackrock, Ballintemple and the Monahan Road. Routes 215 and 215A serve Mahon Point Shopping Centre via Ballinlough, Cork City Centre and Blackpool from Blarney. Route 219 serves Mahon via Douglas, Turner's Cross, Glasheen, from CUH and Munster Technological University Bishopstown Campus.

== Sport ==
Sporting clubs in the Mahon area include St Michael's GAA Club, Ballinure GAA Club and Ringmahon Rangers Football Club.

Mahon Golf Club is located at Clover Hill House off Skehard Road and owned by Cork City Council. Designed by Eddie Hackett, Mahon Golf Course is an 18-hole golf course and Ireland's first purpose made municipal golf course. It was financially assisted by the Golfing Union of Ireland. The course was officially opened on 3 September 1980 and was named the "Ted McCarthy Municipal Golf Course" after a long-serving local councillor.

== Schools ==
Mahon has three schools including Secondary School Nagle Community College and primary schools Scoil na Croise Naofa (Holy Cross School) and the Irish speaking Gaelscoil Mhachan (Mahon Gaelscoil).

Nagle Community College is situated on Avenue de Rennes in the centre of Mahon. The college was built on land owned by Joseph Nagle (uncle of Nano Nagle founder of the Presentation Sisters), with the first classes held in September 1981.

Scoil na Croise Naofa (Holy Cross School) is also situated on Avenue de Rennes. The school opened in September 1984 to provide primary education for the children in the (then) growing suburb of Mahon. The school is in the trusteeship of the Bishop of Cork and Ross. In 2005, the status of the school changed to co-educational. Scoil na Croise Naofa also has an "Early Start" preschool on the premises.

Gaelscoil Mhachan was founded in 1986, with the intention of providing education through Irish to children in their area. The school was officially recognised by the Department of Education in 1987, and originally located at Ringmahon House. It moved into a new building on Avenue de Rennes in 2001, with a further extension opened in 2008.

== In popular culture ==
The movie Strength and Honour written by Mark Mahon was made around Cork City, and includes some scenes filmed at St. Michael's graveyard in Mahon. The movie was premiered at the Cannes Film Festival in May 2007, and won the "Best Picture" and "Best Actor" awards at the Boston Film Festival.

== Notable people ==
- John James Murphy (1796–1883), archdeacon and founder of the Mercy Hospital and North Infirmary Hospital. He was born in Ringmahon House, Mahon in 1796.
- Ben Dunne (born 1949), an Irish entrepreneur and former director of Dunnes Stores. Also of Ringmahon House, Mahon.
- Wayne Sherlock (born 1978), hurler with links to Blackrock GAA Club and Cork. His honours include three All-Ireland titles and an All Star award.
- Gary O'Sullivan (born 1984), professional boxer and former Irish middleweight champion.
- Marian Heffernan (born 1982), former Irish Olympic Runner and wife of World Champion and Olympic Medalist Robert Heffernan.
- Alan Browne (born 1995), professional footballer formerly of Ringmahon Rangers, and currently with Preston North End F.C.
