= Mahone =

Mahone is a surname.

Mahone or Mahones in plural may refer to:

== Mahone ==
=== Places ===
- Mahone Bay, bay on the Atlantic coast of Nova Scotia, Canada
- Mahone Bay, Nova Scotia, town located on the northwest shore of Mahone Bay
- Mahone, West Virginia, unincorporated community in Ritchie County, West Virginia, United States

=== People ===
- Austin Mahone (born 1996), American pop singer and songwriter
- Ernest Mahone (born 1961), American pediatric neuropsychologist and director
- Gildo Mahones (born 1929), American jazz pianist
- Michele Mahone (born 1971), American television entertainment reporter and standup comedian
- Otelia Butler Mahone (1835–1911), American nurse during the American Civil War and the wife of Confederate Major General William Mahone
- Robert B. Mahone (1858–1914), Consul of the United States at Nuevo Laredo, Mexico
- William Mahone (1826–1895), American civil engineer, railroad executive, soldier and politician
- William T. Mahone Jr. also known as Master Willie Mahone, (1856–1927), American businessman and government official

=== Music ===
- The Family Mahone, a folk rock band from Manchester, England

=== Others ===
- Pogue Mahone, a Gaelic term meaning "kiss my ass" and the name of the seventh album by The Pogues
- Alexander Mahone, a fictional character from the television show Prison Break.

== Mahones ==
=== Sports ===
- CF Sporting Mahonés, Spanish football team based in Mahón, Menorca, in the autonomous community of Balearic Islands
- Estadi Mahonés, football stadium in Mahón, Menorca, Spain, in the autonomous community of Balearic Islands

=== Music ===
- Gildo Mahones (born 1929), American jazz pianist
- The Mahones, Irish-born Canadian Irish punk band

== See also ==
- Mahon (disambiguation)
- McMahon (disambiguation)
- MacMahon (disambiguation)
