= Mahon (disambiguation) =

Mahón is a municipality, capital city of Menorca, Balearic Islands, Spain, and seat of the Island Council of Menorca.

Mahon may also refer to:

== Places and features ==
=== Ireland ===
- Lough Mahon, a sea lough in County Cork
- Mahon, Cork, area in Cork city
  - Mahon Point Shopping Centre
- Mahon Bridge, a small village in County Waterford
- River Mahon, County Waterford

=== United States ===
- Mahon, Indiana, an unincorporated community
- Mahon, Mississippi, an unincorporated community
- Port Mahon (Delaware), a port on Delaware Bay

=== Elsewhere ===
- Mahone Bay, Nova Scotia, Canada, the bay
  - Mahone Bay, Nova Scotia, Canada, the town
- Port Mahon, former houses in the Ponderosa area of Sheffield, England; see Ponderosa (Sheffield)

== Other uses ==
- Mahon (name) (includes a list of persons with the name)
- Mahon Tribunal, an inquiry into political corruption in Ireland

== See also ==
- Mahón cheese
- Mahone (disambiguation)
- McMahon (disambiguation)
- MacMahon (disambiguation)
