= McMahan =

McMahan is a surname. Notable people with the surname include:

- Alan McMahan, Christian theologian
- Brian McMahan (born 1969), American guitarist
- Chad McMahan (born 1972), American politician
- Jack McMahan (1932–2020), American baseball player
- Jeff McMahan (philosopher) (born 1954), American philosopher
- Jeff McMahan (politician), American politician
- Kevin McMahan (born 1983), American football player
- Mickey McMahan (1930–2008), American trumpeter
- Mike McMahan, American comedy writer
- Richard McMahan (1932–2011), American politician from Florida
- Robert McMahan (born 1961), American physicist and university president
- Ronnie McMahan (born 1972), American basketball player
- W. Edwin McMahan (born 1944), American politician

== See also ==
- McMahan Mound Site, an archaeological site in Sevierville, Tennessee, United States
- McMahan Homestead, historic home in Chautauqua County, New York, United States
- McMahan, Texas, an unincorporated community in Caldwell County, Texas, United States
- McMahen
- McMahon (disambiguation)
- McMann
