= Ben Dunne =

Ben Dunne may refer to:

- Ben Dunne (businessman, born 1908) (1908–1983), Irish businessman who founded Dunnes Stores
- Ben Dunne (businessman, born 1949) (1949–2023), Irish businessman, son of the above
