= Ringmahon House =

Building in Cork, Ireland

Coordinates: 51.8953°N 8.4023°W

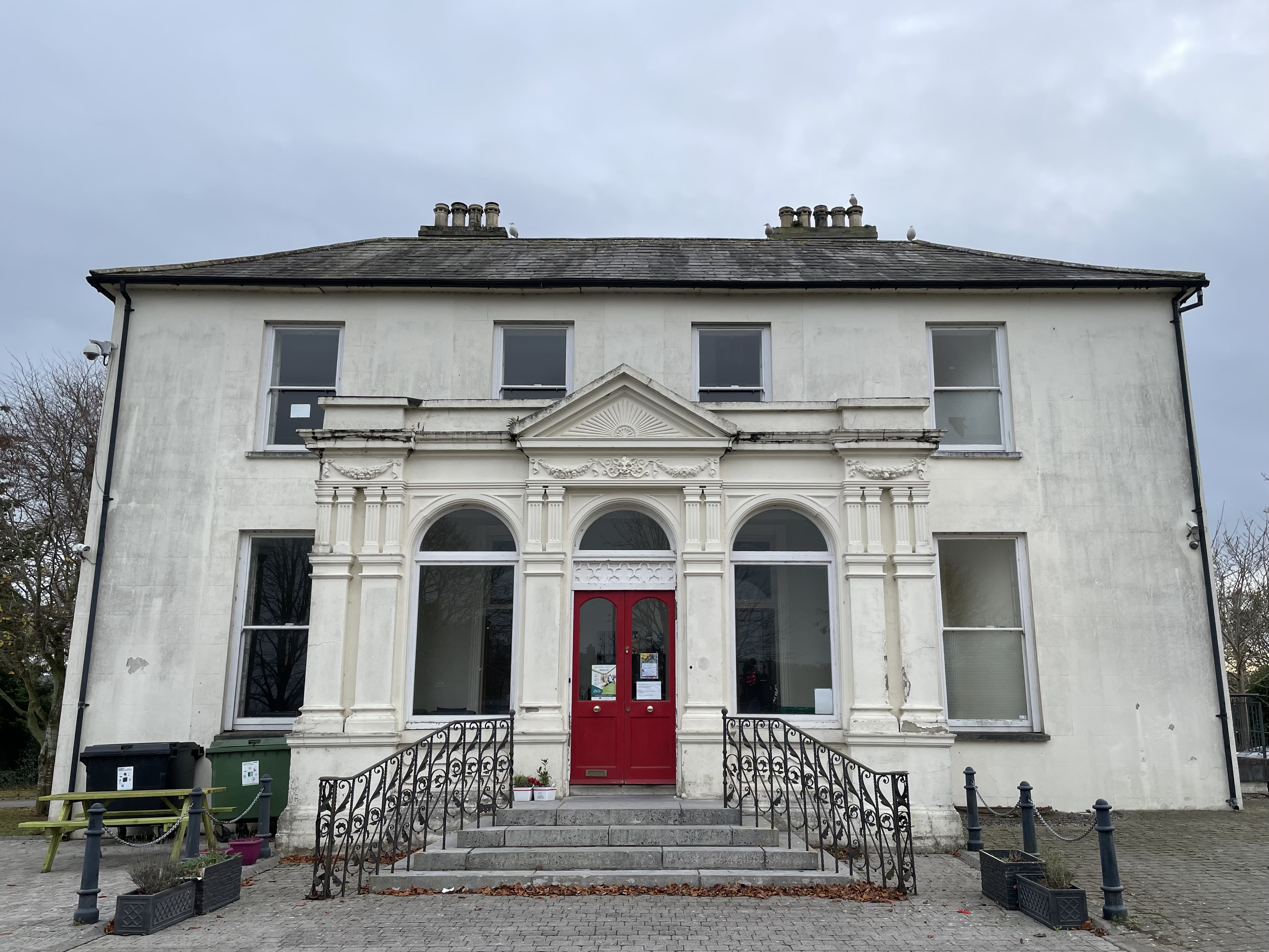
Ringmahon House facade

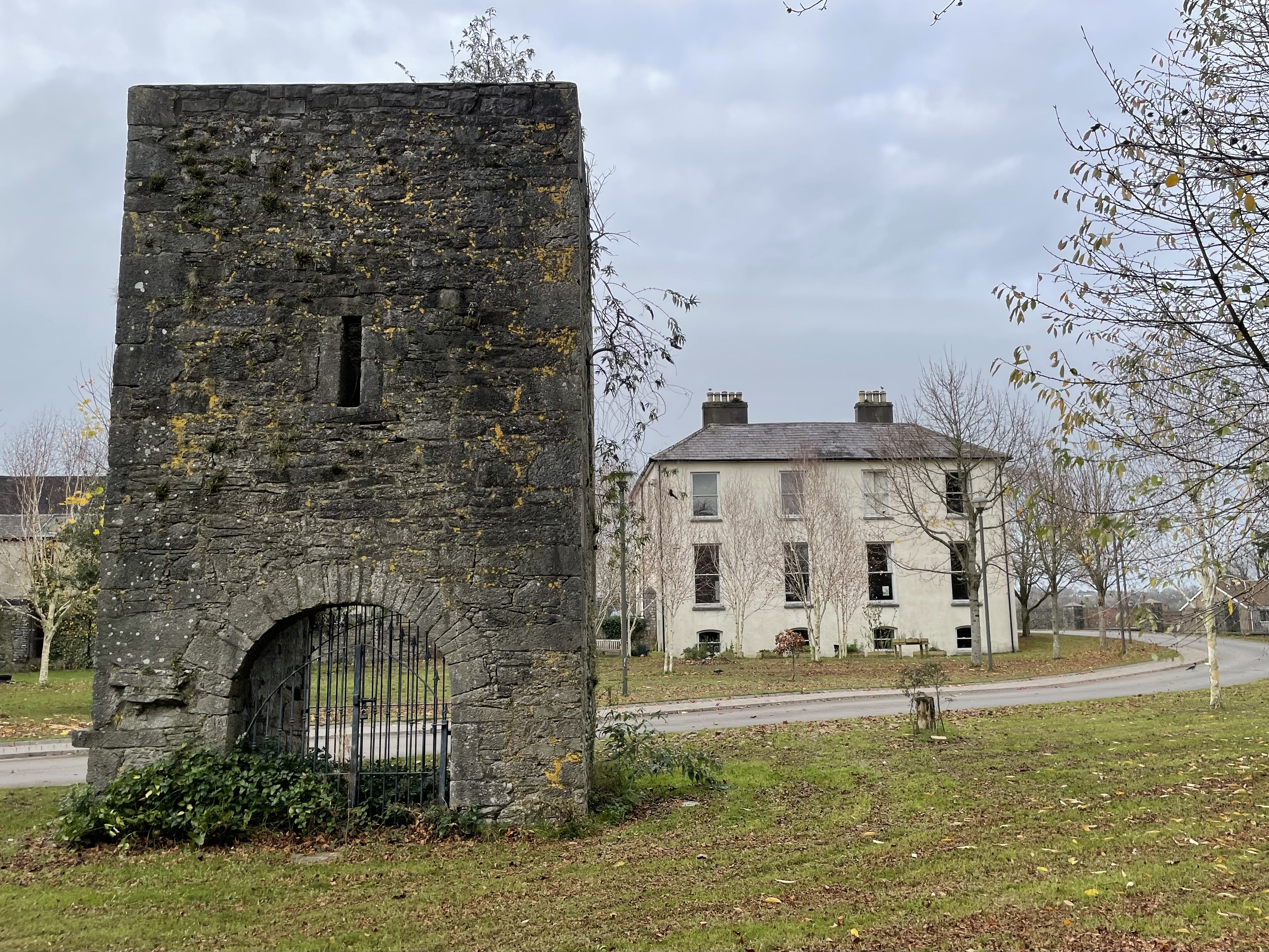
The ruins of Ringmahon Castle's gate tower, now in the grounds of Ringmahon House, were reduced in height as part of stablisation works

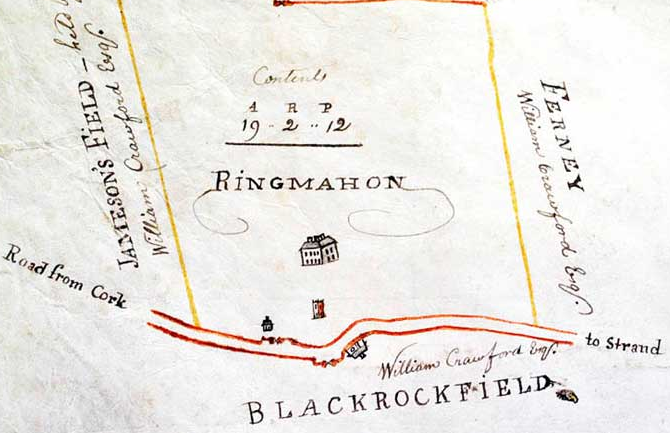
Map, extracted from an 1830s lease document, showing Ringmahon House, Ringmahon Castle and the surrounding lands of William Crawford

Ringmahon House is a 19th-century house in the Mahon and Blackrock area of Cork in Ireland. Built c. 1820 by James Murphy (of Murphy's Brewery), the house was owned by Ben Dunne (of Dunnes Stores) in the mid-20th century. As of the 21st century, the house is owned by Cork City Council and is used as a school by Mahon Youthreach.

The grounds of Ringmahon House contain the former gate tower of an earlier castle. The remains of this structure, known as Ringmahon Castle, are included in the Record of Protected Structures maintained by Cork City Council.

== History ==
Ringmahon House is built on the site of an earlier castle, known as Ringmahon Castle. According to John Windele's Historical and Descriptive Notices of the City of Cork and Its Vicinity (published in 1839), Ringmahon Castle and the surrounding Mahon peninsula take their name from the Irish word rinn (meaning peninsula) and Mahon (a reference to the O'Mahony family who controlled much of the area). The castle, though undated, is included in 17th century maps. Historically associated with the Crawford and Chatterton families, the lands at Ringmahon were leased to the Murphy family by the start of the 19th century.

James Murphy (1769–1855) built Ringmahon House, to a Georgian design, around 1820. Additional developments, including the addition of a porch with "Tuscan pilasters", were undertaken in the mid-19th century. For much of the 19th century, Ringmahon was occupied by the Murphy family, owners of Murphy's Brewery in Cork city.

By the 1940s, the house was owned by Ben Dunne Snr, the founder of Dunnes Stores. Several members of the Dunne family, including Ben Dunne Jnr, were raised in the house and described as having "fond memories of growing up in Ringmahon House".

The house, which was subsequently purchased by Cork City Council, housed a gaelscoil in the 1990s. This school, Gaelscoil Mhachan, moved to purpose-built premises nearby in 2001. Ringmahon House was redeveloped by Cork City Council c. 2004, and now houses the Youthreach education project. Mahon Youthreach is funded by the Cork Education and Training Board.
