= McMahon House =

McMahon House may refer to:

== United States ==
- John McMahon House, Courtland, Alabama, NRHP-listed
- McMahon House (Dubuque, Iowa), listed on the NRHP in Dubuque County, Iowa
- Thomas and Bridget Shanahan McMahon House, Faribault, Minnesota, NRHP-listed
