= Bernard MacMahon =

Bernard MacMahon or McMahon may refer to:

- Bernard MacMahon (bishop) (1680–1747), Irish Roman Catholic prelate; Archbishop of Armagh
- Bernard MacMahon (bible translator) (c. 1736–1816), Irish Catholic priest, who translated the Douay-Rheims New Testament and the complete Bible
- Bernard McMahon (died 1816), Irish-American horticulturist, most famous for The American Gardener's Calendar
- Bernard MacMahon (filmmaker), English newspaper writer and music video director
- Bernard McMahon (murder victim), Irish victim of the McMahon killings

== See also ==
- MacMahon (disambiguation)
