= Mahen =

Mahen may refer to:

- Mahen Gunasekera (born 1953), Sri Lankan lawyer and politician
- Mahen Gopallawa, Sri Lankan lawyer
- Jiří Mahen, pen name of Antonín Vančura (1882–1939), Czech novelist and playwright
- Mahen Theatre, a theatre in Brno, Czech Republic

== See also ==
- McMahen
