= McGahon =

McGahon is an Irish surname. Notable people with the surname include:

- Brendan McGahon (1917–2017), Irish politician
- John McGahon (born 1990), Irish politician

== See also ==
- McGowan
- McMahon (disambiguation)
