= CD Menorca =

Spanish association football club

Menorca
- Full name: Club Deportivo Menorca
- Founded: 1918
- Ground: Estadi Mahonés, Mahón; Balearic Islands, Spain
- Capacity: 4,000
- President: Ángel Salmerón
- Head coach: Pedro Palliser
- League: División de Honor – Menorca
- 2025–26: División de Honor – Menorca, 6th of 11
- Website: https://www.cdmenorca.es/
Home colours	Away colours

Club Deportivo Menorca is a Spanish football team based in Mahón, Menorca, in the autonomous community of the Balearic Islands. Founded in 1918, they currently play in División de Honor – Menorca, holding home matches at the Estadi Mahonés, with a capacity of 4,000 people.

In 1974 Menorca merged with UD Mahón to create CF Sporting Mahonés. The club returned to an independent status in 2000, and ceased activities again in 2017 for two years before returning to action.

== History ==
=== Club background ===
- Menorca Flighter – (1918–1920)
- Menorca Football Club – (1920–1940)
- Club Deportivo Menorca – (1940–present)

== Season to season ==
Season	Tier	Division	Place	Copa del Rey
1944–45	4	1ª Reg.	5th	
1945–46	4	1ª Reg.	5th	
1946–47	4	1ª Reg.	3rd	
1947–48	4	1ª Reg.	3rd	
1948–49	4	1ª Reg.		
1949–50	4	1ª Reg.		
1950–51	4	1ª Reg.	7th	
1951–52	4	1ª Reg.	1st	
1952–53	4	1ª Reg.	2nd	
1953–54	4	1ª Reg.	1st	
1954–55	3	3ª	2nd	
1955–56	3	3ª	2nd	
1956–57	3	3ª	18th	
1957–58	3	3ª	10th	
1958–59	3	3ª	9th	
1959–60	3	3ª	4th	
1960–61	3	3ª	6th	
1961–62	3	3ª	1st	
1962–63	3	3ª	4th	
1963–64	3	3ª	1st	

Season	Tier	Division	Place	Copa del Rey
1964–65	3	3ª	2nd	
1965–66	3	3ª	3rd	
1966–67	3	3ª	5th	
1967–68	3	3ª	4th	
1968–69	3	3ª	16th	
1969–70	3	3ª	17th	
1970–71	4	1ª Reg.	3rd	
1971–72	4	1ª Reg.	1st	
1972–73	3	3ª	6th	
1973–74	3	3ª	15th	
1974–2000	DNP			
2000–01	5	Reg. Pref.	8th	
2001–02	5	Reg. Pref.	4th	
2002–03	5	Reg. Pref.	11th	
2003–04	5	Reg. Pref.	10th	
2004–05	5	Reg. Pref.	10th	
2005–06	5	Reg. Pref.	7th	
2006–07	5	Reg. Pref.	11th	
2007–08	5	Reg. Pref.	7th	
2008–09	5	Reg. Pref.	8th	

Season	Tier	Division	Place	Copa del Rey
2009–10	5	Reg. Pref.	8th	
2010–11	5	Reg. Pref.	5th	
2011–12	5	Reg. Pref.	5th	
2012–13	5	Reg. Pref.	3rd	
2013–14	5	Reg. Pref.	5th	
2014–15	5	Reg. Pref.	8th	
2015–16	5	Reg. Pref.	4th	
2016–17	5	Reg. Pref.	9th	
2017–18	DNP			
2018–19	DNP			
2019–20	5	Reg. Pref.	7th	
2020–21	5	Reg. Pref.	4th	
2021–22	6	Reg. Pref.	1st	
2022–23	6	Reg. Pref.	7th	
2023–24	6	Reg. Pref.	3rd	
2024–25	6	Div. Hon.	3rd	
2025–26	6	Div. Hon.		

- 19 seasons in Tercera División
