= Darrers =

Former department store in Ireland

- Trade name: Darrers Stores
- Industry: Retail
- Founded: 8 August 1946
- Defunct: June 2007
- Headquarters: Waterford
- Key people: Brendan Darrer

Darrers Stores was a department store and supermarket brand with outlets in Waterford, Dungarvan, Tramore and Carlow, in Ireland. The chain operated as both a grocers and drapers, and is believed to be one of the first Irish stores to introduce a free plastic shopping bag.

== History ==
William Desmond "Des" Darrer first opened a store in partnership with Ben Dunne in Cork known as Dunnes Stores in 1944. The first branch of what went on to be Darrers was opened in Waterford by Darrer and Dunne, under the name Dunnes Stores, on 8 August 1946 on Cathedral Street. The partnership between Dunne and Darrer was dissolved in 1952, with Darrer becoming the sole owner of the Waterford store, which was then re-named Darrers. Another Waterford branch was later opened on George's Street in the late 1960s. A site known as Hennebry's Yard was purchased and incorporated into the retail space, which at its height occupied 40,000 square feet over 3 floors. The Carlow store was opened on 19 November 1965, with Brendan Darrer as the manager. Brendan took over from his father managing the Waterford store after his death in 1967. Michael Darrer ran the Tramore branch of the chain. Both the Dungarvan and Tramore stores pioneered home delivery service and were the first local businesses to introduce late night shopping, remaining open until 9pm.

The stores in Dungarvan and Carlow closed in 2007 when the company was dissolved in June that year. It followed the closure of the Waterford store in 1995.

Darrers was reputedly one of the first stores to introduce the concept of a free plastic shopping bag. In some parts of Waterford and Carlow, "Darrers Bag" became a synonym for "plastic shopping bag", and retained meme status following the store's closure.
