= City Gate Mahon =

Office and medical complex in Cork, Ireland

City Gate

General information
- Type: Office, medical
- Location: Mahon, Cork, Ireland
- Coordinates: 51°53′21″N 8°23′50″W

Technical details
- Floor count: 5

Website
- http://www.citygatemahon.com/

City Gate Mahon is an office and medical complex in Mahon, Cork, Ireland.

== Office ==
Regus have offices in City Gate Mahon, as do Itron, Qualcomm, FireEye, Hedgeserv, Aruba Networks and E-Bridge Training.

Several technology companies, including SolarWinds, Big Fish Games and McAfee have their European or EMEA headquarters at City Gate. Quest Software also has one of their EMEA offices here.

The national headquarters of the Health Information and Quality Authority is also located at City Gate.

== Medical ==
The Citygate Specialist Dental Clinic opened its dental hub at City Gate in February 2011 and offers specialist dental services. VHI Swiftcare also have an urgent-care clinic in City Gate Mahon.

The Mater Private Hospital also have a 75-bed private hospital facility in the development.

== Retail ==
Retail space in City Gate Park, an extension to City Gate Mahon, is occupied by the furniture retailer DFS, together with Starbucks Coffee and a gym franchise of Energie Fitness.
