= BD Gyms =

Irish gym chain

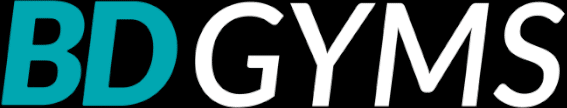
- Company type: Private
- Industry: Gyms, Fitness
- Genre: Fitness
- Founded: 1997
- Founder: Ben Dunne
- Headquarters: Dublin, Ireland
- Area served: Greater Dublin, Navan, Portlaoise
- Parent: Barkisland (Developments) Ltd
- Website: bdgyms.com

BD Gyms is an Irish chain of gyms, formerly known as Ben Dunne Gyms, with five locations in Ireland. The company was founded in June 1997 when it opened its first gym in Blanchardstown, Dublin. Originally a "mid to high end full service health club chain", the company reevaluated the market and subsequently focused on providing "no frills gym facilities" at lower prices.

By 2012, the group had over 40,000 members, increasing to 53,000 members (and 90 staff) by 2020.

The company expanded into the United Kingdom and subsequently sold the three branches to JD Sports in 2018 and they became JD Gyms.

The company was badly hit by the 2020 covid pandemic and had to shut half of its gyms which helped the company return to profitability by 2023 but membership had dropped to 25,000.

The company rebranded in 2024 moving away from Ben Dunne Gyms name to BD Gyms.

Former logo until 2024
