= McMahen =

McMahen is a surname. Notable people with the surname include:

- Noel McMahen (born 1926), Australian rules footballer and coach
- Royce L. McMahen (1923–1999), American veterinarian and sheriff
- Ryan McMahen (born 1982), American soccer player
- Wayne McMahen, Republican member of the Louisiana House of Representatives

== See also ==
- McMahan
- McMahon (disambiguation)
- McMann
