= Margaret Heffernan (Irish businesswoman) =

Irish businesswoman, CEO of retailer Dunnes Stores

- Born: Margaret Dunne; 1942 (age 83–84); Cork, Ireland
- Known for: Director, and former CEO, of Dunnes Stores
- Spouse: Andrew Heffernan (died 2026)
- Children: 4
- Parent: Ben Dunne
- Relatives: Ben Dunne Jnr (brother)

Margaret Heffernan (née Dunne; born 1942) is an Irish businesswoman. Having left school at 14 to join what became one of Ireland's largest retailers, Dunnes Stores, she became one of its two main shareholders in the early 1990s, and later its CEO.

== Early life ==
Margaret Dunne was born in Cork in 1942, the eldest of the six children of Nora Maloney and Ben Dunne, who founded Dunnes Stores. One of her brothers was Ben Dunne Jnr, who preceded her as CEO of Dunnes Stores, the eldest is Francis, usually known as Frank, while her sisters included Anne, Thérèse and Elizabeth.

== Career ==
Heffernan left school at 14, in 1956, to begin working for her father at his Dunnes clothing shop on St Patrick's Street in Cork, which he had founded after leaving the chief buyer position at Roches Stores. She became a director of the company in 1964, and has worked there all her employed life. She took a leading role in textile buying, and later also strategy, and once sent her brother, then CEO, back to reverse a £20 million deal for cheap shirts of which she did not approve. She also developed a reputation for tough negotiations with outside parties, including unions, with the company involved in 448 legal actions in a five year period.

Heffernan took over the lead in running Dunnes Stores in stages from 1992 to 1994, following her brother Ben Dunne Jnr's removal as chairman and joint managing director by the board of the company after his arrest for cocaine possession and soliciting while on a golfing holiday in Florida, USA, as well as disagreements on strategy, with Heffernan favouring moving "upmarket" with good margins and Ben Dunne preferring to cut margins and increase volume. Having assumed control of the company's personnel function, she was fined in 1993 for the closure of a shop without the required redundancy notice to staff. By April 1993, Ben Dunne's responsibilities for menswear, footwear and own-brand manufacturing had all been removed, and Margaret Heffernan and Frank Dunne were supervising all operations other than food. By 1995, she was the primary lead for the Dunnes Stores group of companies.

Ben Dunne Jnr was again embroiled in scandal in the mid-1990s when it emerged he had given large amounts of money to a number of Irish politicians, mainly from the Fianna Fáil party including the then Taoiseach, Charles Haughey. Heffernan had discovered several six-figure payments her brother had made to Haughey, and went to Haughey's home to discuss these. She subsequently swore affidavits about the transactions, despite Haughey urging her not to do so, and this contributed to the setting up of the McCracken Tribunal and the Moriarty Tribunal.

Heffernan has been credited with transforming the Dunnes Stores operation, moving it more upmarket and reinforcing the value of the brand. As part of this, she engaged designers such as Paul Costelloe to produce dedicated lines for Dunnes, and media gardener Diarmuid Gavin to provide complementary offerings.

In 2004, she gave the eldest of her sons, Michael Heffernan, a €30m stake in Dunnes Stores, and by 2008, was believed to have given away 6.4% of Dunnes Stores shares, probably between her four children. As of 2008, she was one of just two directors of the Dunnes holding company, holding the role of director of textile business, while her brother Frank was managing director.

In 2017, it was reported that Heffernan was giving up much of her hands-on role at the company to her daughter Anne Heffernan, a medical doctor, and her niece Sharon McMahon, who were appointed directors of all Dunnes Stores companies, with the former as overall head of operations, especially groceries, and the latter managing property and investment matters.

The Irish Times has described Heffernan as "Ireland's most formidable businesswoman".

== Personal life ==
Heffernan was married to Andrew Heffernan, a consultant endocrinologist, who died in February 2026. They had four children together, three boys and a girl - at least three of whom later became involved in the family business - and at least six grandchildren.

Heffernan is a teetotaler, and stated to be religious. She bought Stackallen House for £1.75 million in 1993, but sold it on quickly to Martin Naughton, stating that the running costs were too high. She was estimated by The Sunday Times to be worth €625 million in 2008, and by the Sunday Independent to be worth €270 million in 2015.

At one point Heffernan opened a personal Yves Saint Laurent boutique, later closing that business. She also has a strong interest in horse racing, and was made an honorary member of Ireland's Turf Club.

== Voluntary work ==
Heffernan helped set up The People in Need Trust in 1988; it has subsequently raised tens of millions of euro, with a focus on supporting local charitable activity. She was a founding sponsor of the Education and Research Centre at St. Vincent's Hospital, Dublin, further leading fundraising initiatives for that project, as well as for the Diabetes Centre at the hospital, and for the conversion of the chapel at the former Carysfort College to a library for the Smurfit School of Business.

== Recognition ==
Heffernan won the City of Dublin's Millennium Award for her charity work in 1988, and was one of the first awardees for Dublin's Lord Mayor's Award, in 1989.

Heffernan was in 2007 awarded an honorary degree of Doctor of Laws by the National University of Ireland in recognition of her business and charitable work; the Sunday Times has reported that she also holds a second honorary degree.
