= Lough Mahon =

Inlet of Cork Harbour, Ireland

- Loch Machan (Irish)
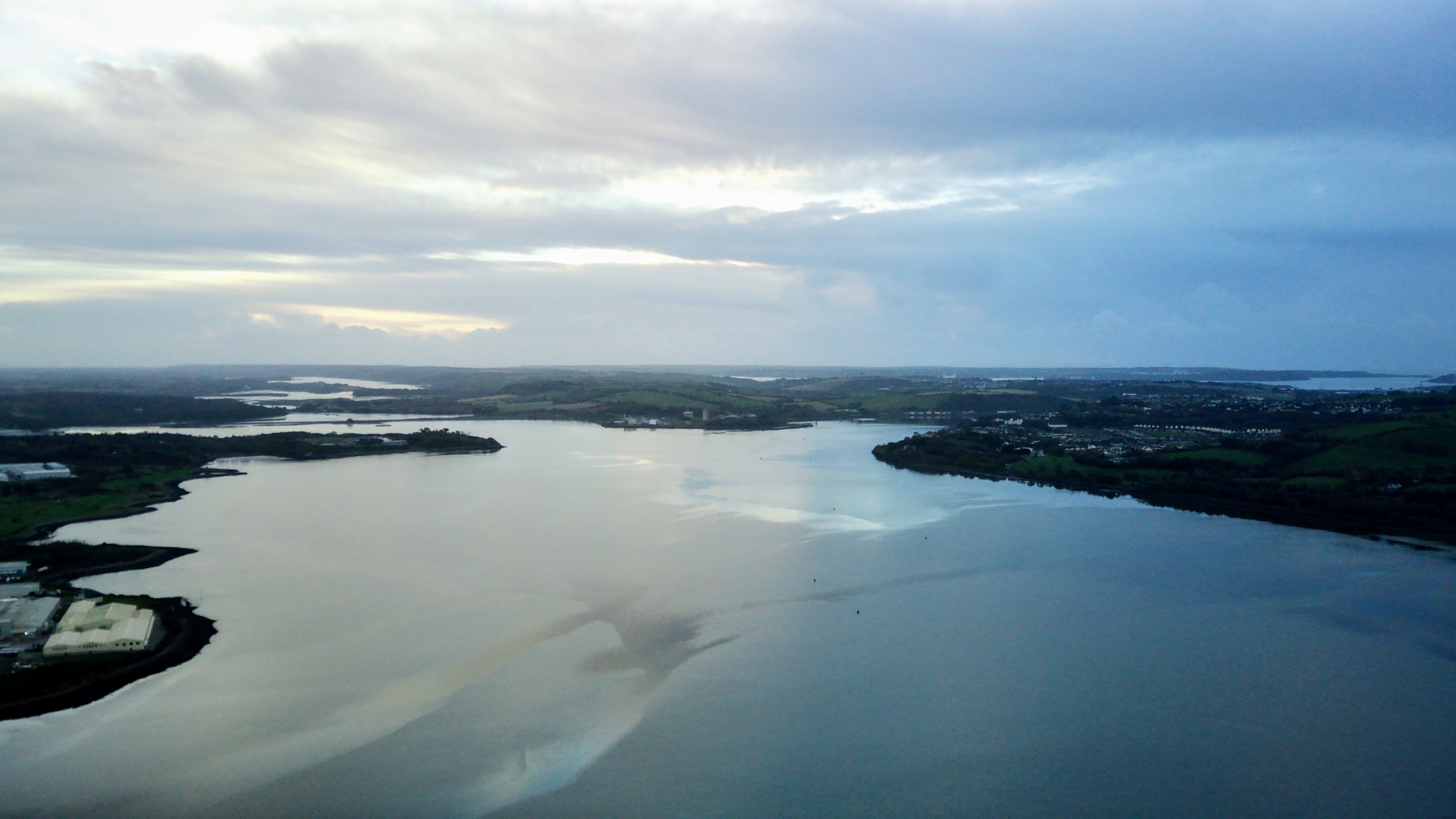
- An aerial view of Lough Mahon taken from the Mahon peninsula (looking south-east).

- Location in Ireland Lough Mahon (County Cork)
- Location: Cork/County Cork
- Coordinates: 51°53′N 8°22′W
- Primary inflows: River Lee, Glashaboy River, Tramore River
- Primary outflows: River Lee
- Basin countries: Ireland
- Max. length: 3 km (1.9 mi)
- Max. width: 5 km (3.1 mi)
- Surface area: 12.23 km^{2} (4.72 sq mi)

Lough Mahon (Irish: Loch Machan) is a sea lough in the north-western part of Cork Harbour. Its area is about 12 km^{2} (5 sq mi).

Several Cork suburbs, such as Mahon, Douglas, Rochestown, Blackrock and Ballinlough as well as the town of Passage West are on its southern and western shores. To the north is Little Island and to the east Great Island.

Lough Mahon falls within the Cork Harbour "Special Protection Area", as designated under the EU Birds Directive, and is an important habitat for a number of bird species and migrating waders in particular.
