= Estadi Mahonés =

Football stadium in Menorca, Spain

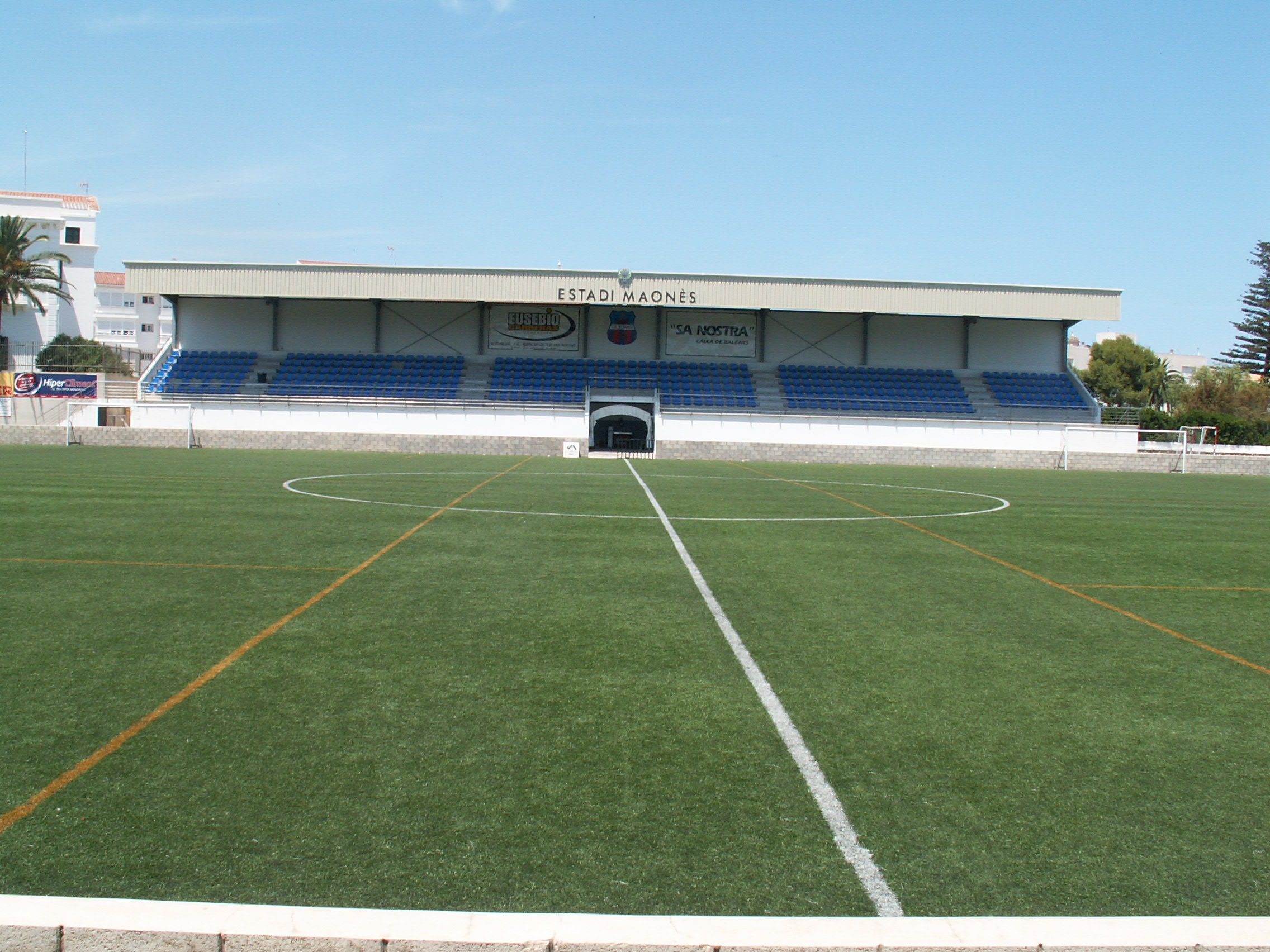
- Interactive map of Estadi Mahonés
- Location: Mahón, Menorca
- Coordinates: 39.886°N 4.261°E

The Estadi Mahonés is a football stadium in Mahón, Menorca, Spain. It is home to CD Menorca. It is currently the biggest stadium in Menorca, housing 4000 spectators.
