= Alan McMahan =

Dr. Martin Alan McMahan is an associate professor of Intercultural Studies, and Chair of the Undergraduate Department of Anthropology and Intercultural Studies at Biola University, and past president of the American Society for Church Growth.

== Biography ==
Dr. Alan McMahan graduated with a Ph.D. from Fuller Theological Seminary, where his dissertation was entitled "Training Turnaround Leaders, Systemic Approaches to Reinstate Growth in Plateaued Churches." McMahan has also earned a Th.M. from Asbury Theological Seminary, a M. Div. at Alliance Theological Seminary, and a B.S. at Nyack College.

McMahan has served in churches in North America and on the Pacific Rim, and has taught in the disciplines of missiology, church growth, leadership, organizational development, and evangelism. His students have included both undergraduate and graduate, mid-career professionals, Bible school teachers, pastors, and denominational leaders through the United States, Canada, and much of Southeast Asia. He maintains an active consulting service in churches and is the former president of the American Society of Church Growth. He has served as a Vice President for the Alliance Theological Seminary, and as the Academic Dean at The King's College in mid-town Manhattan. He currently serves as the chair of the undergraduate program at Biola University. He has a wife, Terri, and two sons, Billy and Jonathan, and lives in La Mirada, California.

== Affiliations and awards ==
As well as the American Society for Church Growth, McMahan is affiliated to the American Society of Missiology and the International Association for Mission Studies, and is a member of the Overseas Missions Study Center (OMSC) Study Group on Missions Issues. McMahan was selected as a distinguished educator by Who’s Who Among America’s Teachers in 1996, 1998, 2000, 2002, 2004, and 2006. He received the Leadership Award from Fuller Theological Seminary in 1998, and the Donald McGavran Church Growth Award from Fuller Theological Seminary in the same year. As a student he was a member of the Theta Phi Honor Society at Asbury Theological Seminary in 1989, and was honoured in the Who’s Who Among Students in American Colleges and Universities while at Nyack College in 1979 and 1980.

== Publications ==
- “Training Turnaround Leaders: Systematic Approaches to Reinstating Growth in Plateaued Churches.” 1998. University Microfilms, Inc.
- “Book Review: Human Capital: What it Is and Why People Invest It.” Strategies for Today's Leaders Third Quarter 2001 (Web edition).
- “Church Growth Consulting: Evolution of an Intervention.” Journal of the American Society for Church Growth Fall 2004.
- “Guest Editor” Journal for the American Society for Church Growth Fall 2004.
