= McMahon House (Dubuque, Iowa) =

Historic house in Iowa, United States

- U.S. National Register of Historic Places
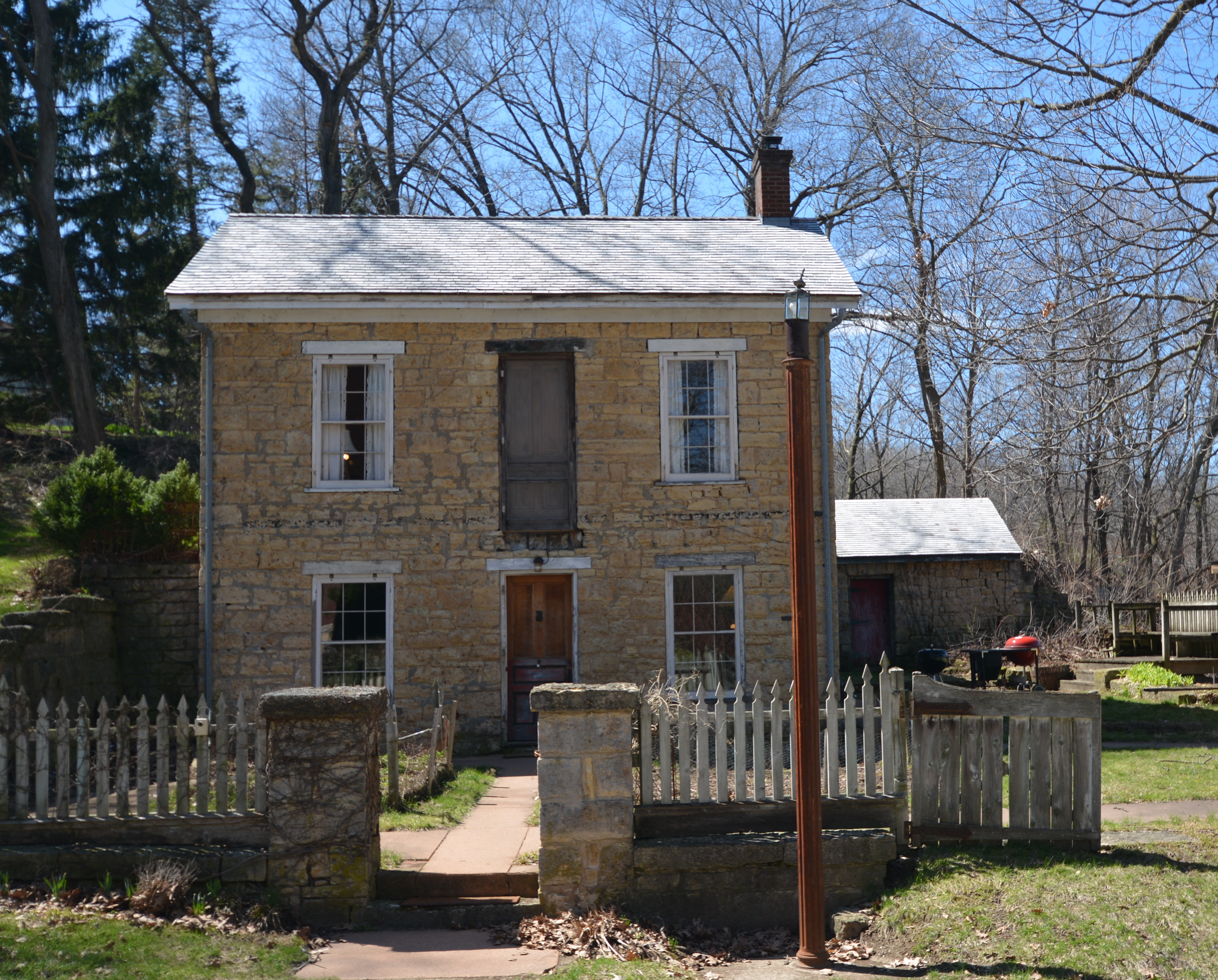

- Location within Iowa Location within the United States
- Location: 800 English Lane; Dubuque, Iowa
- Coordinates: 42°28′48″N 90°40′19″W
- Area: less than one acre
- Built: 1861
- Built by: Ross McMahon
- NRHP reference No.: 76000765
- Added to NRHP: November 21, 1976

The McMahon House is a historic building located in Dubuque, Iowa, United States. This two-story stone structure was built by Ross McMahon, a master stonemason, in 1861. It is a good example of early vernacular architecture. There are no windows on the north and west elevations given that the house is built into the side of a hill. The original porch, and its replacement, have both been removed. McMahon did the stonework on several churches and road bridges in the area during the mid to late 19th century. He also had an interest in lead mining, and there are mine shafts on the neighboring property, which had been owned by his son. The house was listed on the National Register of Historic Places in 1976.
