= Mahon Point Shopping Centre =

Large suburban retail facility on the outskirts of Cork, Ireland

- Location: Mahon, Cork, Ireland
- Opened: 2005
- Num. of stores: 60
- Num. of anchor tenants: 3
- Floors: 2
- Parking: 2,500
- Website: Mahon Point Shopping Centre

Mahon Point Shopping Centre, the second largest shopping centre in Munster, and the largest serving Cork city in Ireland, is located in the Mahon area of the city. The centre was opened in February 2005.

== Facilities ==
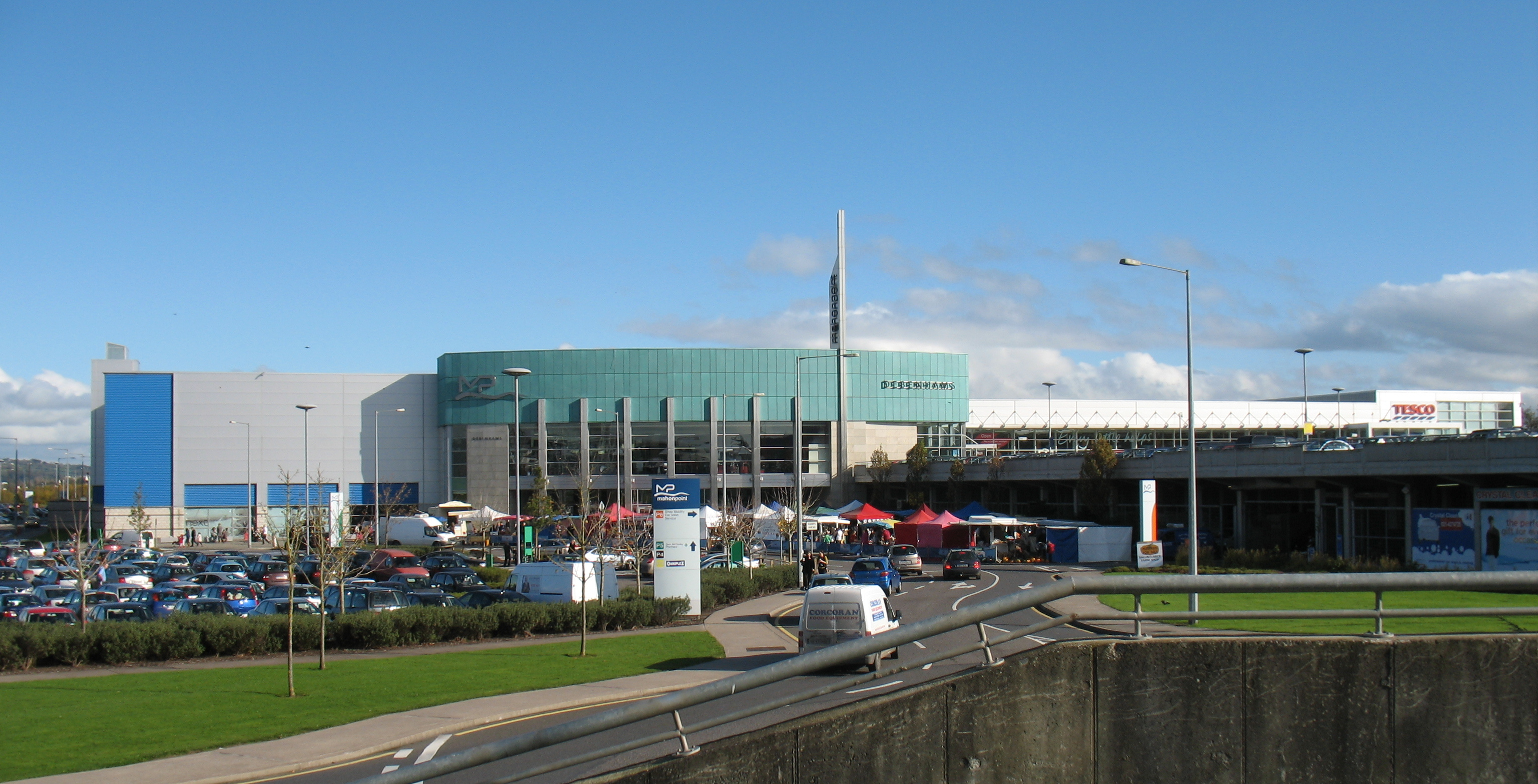
Mahon Point

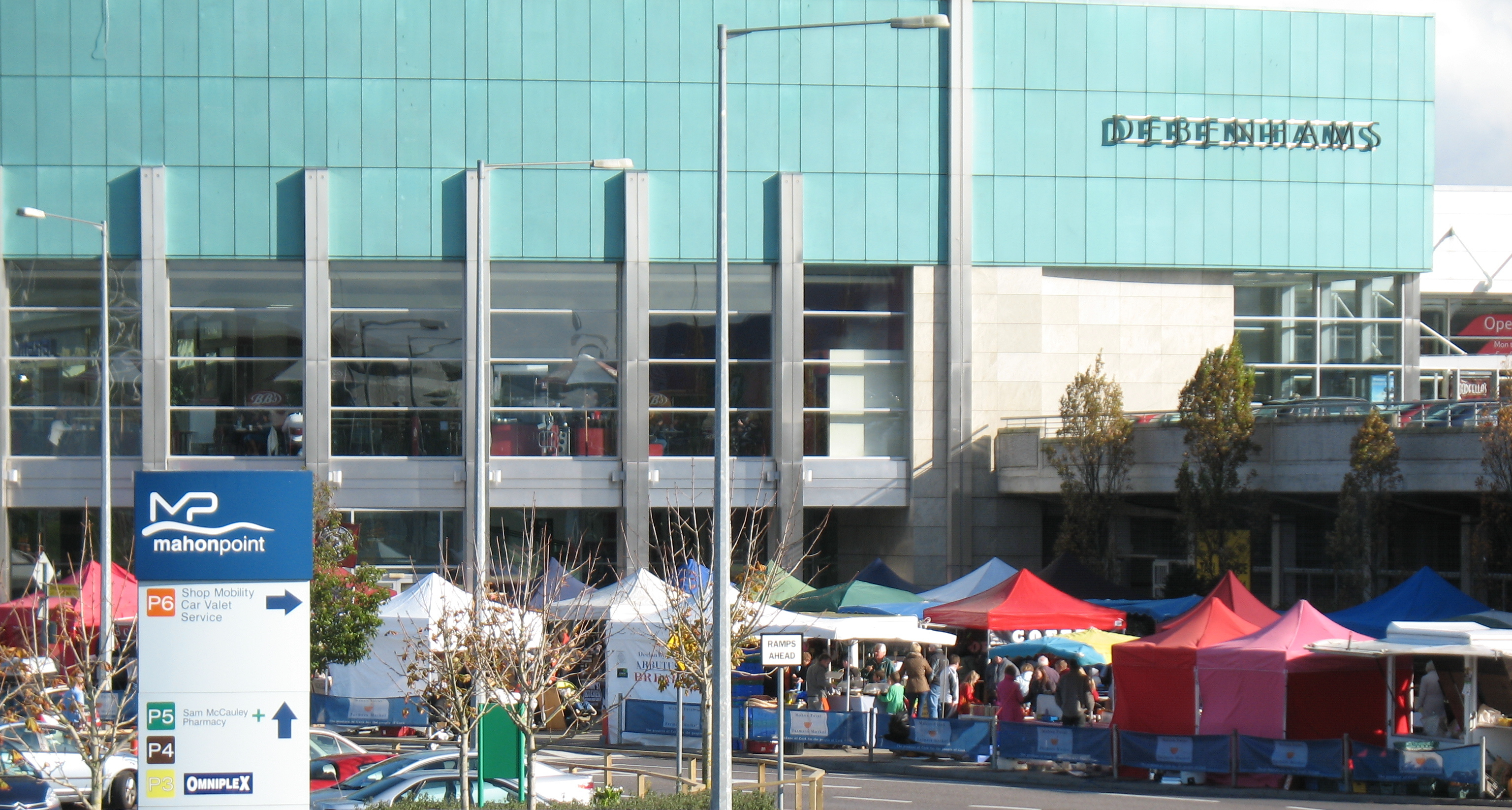
A "farmers market" outside the front entrance of Mahon Point in 2011

When it first opened in early 2005, the centre's anchor tenants included Tesco and Debenhams. The Debenhams outlet closed in April 2020, and was replaced by Sports Direct and Frasers outlets in 2021.

As of 2021, the centre contained over 60 retail stores, including clothing, chemists, homeware and mobile phone providers. Of the clothing stores, there is a Frasers store at the eastern end of the building, as well as River Island, Next, Jack & Jones and Zara outlets. At the western end of the mall is a large Tesco supermarket.

There is a Sky store in the mall, as well as a radio booth (known as "the pod") which is sometimes used for broadcasts by Cork's Red FM. The mall also houses an Omniplex cinema. With 13 screens and 2,500 seats, the cinema also has the first OmniplexMAXX screen in Ireland.

A food court, beside the cinema entrance, has a McDonald's, Wendy's, Abrakebabra and other fast-food outlets. The Wendy's outlet was the first of the chain to open in Ireland. There is also a Nando's restaurant and a Starbucks café.

An adjoining retail park has a number of home and gardening supply stores, including Currys and B&Q.

== Transport ==
The centre has over 2000 indoor and outdoor parking spaces. It is served by the Bus Éireann routes 202, 202A, 212, 215, 215A and 219.
