= Paul McMann =

American sports businessman

Paul J. McMann is the founder of now defunct Collegiate Professional Basketball League (CPBL).

McMann was the Founder and President of the league. He used his financial sales experience to successfully market the internet sponsorships, allowing talented players to receive an education along with a paycheck.

His plan was to set the players to attend college part-time in the city where they could play. If that didn't work out, players could request to postpone their study as long as they completed their study within four years or before the age of 22.

The students were given rent money, tuition money, room and board at any college or an option for trade school within US, $5,000 signing bonus and $9,000 stipend. There was also $10,000 bonus for college players who could graduate in four years and an extra $3,000 a year for students who qualified as a full-time student.

Mcman, a former accounting professor from Babson College made sure the rules were fair for students and offered them a chance to get a degree so they still had a backup plan if they failed to be a professional basketball player.
