= Ben Dunne (businessman, born 1949) =

Irish businessman, 1949–2023

- Born: Bernard Dunne; 11 March 1949; Cork, Ireland
- Died: 18 November 2023 (aged 74); Dubai, United Arab Emirates
- Spouse: Mary
- Children: 4
- Father: Ben Dunne
- Relatives: Margaret Heffernan (sister)

Bernard Dunne (11 March 1949 – 18 November 2023) was an Irish businessman. Director of his family firm, Dunnes Stores, one of the largest chains of department stores in Ireland, he then owned a chain of fitness centres called Ben Dunne Gyms.

== Early life ==
Ben Dunne was born in Cork on 11 March 1949, to Nora Maloney and Ben Dunne, a businessman who founded Dunnes Stores. He was the youngest of six children. Together with his family, he lived at Browningstown Park on the Douglas Road and Ringmahon House on the Mahon peninsula.

== Career ==
Dunne worked for Dunnes Stores, which had been founded by his father, from a young age. He rose to become director of the company, until he was ousted by his family members following controversy in 1992.

=== Kidnapping ===
On the morning of Friday 16 October 1981, Dunne was on his way to open a new supermarket in Portadown, County Armagh when he was kidnapped by the IRA. Dunne was driving northwards when a car coming in the opposite direction overtook a lorry and blocked the lorry's path. The lorry stopped, and Dunne swerved and avoided a collision. Believing an accident had occurred, Dunne stopped and got out of his car to help. The other car reversed towards him, and four men, armed with at least one rifle, got out, surrounded Dunne, put him into the car, and left the scene. Dunne was held for seven days. He was released unharmed in a graveyard in Cullyhanna, County Armagh after his friend and fellow businessman, Patrick Gallagher, paid his £1 million ransom. He initially hid in an open grave, but then, fearing his kidnappers might return and shoot him and fill in the grave, he climbed back out.

=== Florida arrest ===
In 1992, Dunne was arrested for cocaine possession and soliciting while on a golf holiday in Florida. He was arrested by police after allegedly being found in a hotel room with drugs and a prostitute. His arrest triggered the end of his leadership of Dunnes Stores, as family turmoil led to control falling to his sister Margaret Heffernan and the company paying IR£100 million for Ben Dunne's share of the business.

=== Political donations controversy ===
Dunne was again embroiled in scandal in the mid-1990s when it emerged he had given large amounts of money to a number of Irish politicians, mainly from the Fianna Fáil party including the then Taoiseach, Charles Haughey. He also gave money to Michael Lowry of Fine Gael. Mr Justice Brian McCracken, sole member of The McCracken Tribunal which was established by the Irish Government in 1997, found that Dunne had knowingly assisted Lowry in evading his tax obligations. The Tribunal said Dunne and Haughey had a "strange and complex" relationship, with Dunne having made at least five payments in the period of November 1987 to December 1991 to Haughey which totalled to 1.3 million Irish pounds.

On 22 March 2011, the Moriarty Tribunal concluded of Ben Dunne's dealings with Michael Lowry that "What was contemplated and attempted on the part of Mr. Dunne and Mr. Lowry was profoundly corrupt to a degree that was nothing short of breathtaking"; the report referring to its finding that Lowry sought to influence a rent review of a building part-owned by Dunne.

=== Gyms ===
Dunne went on to run a chain of fitness centres called Ben Dunne Gyms, located in Dublin and Liverpool. He personally promoted the gyms on radio, using recent Irish advertising legislation which allows direct comparisons to named competitors. Dunne was working on a new health club, to open in Dún Laoghaire in Dublin, but abandoned the project due to complaints from local residents.

In April 2005, Dunne paid £3,000,000 for a 21-acre (85,000 m^{2}) site in Motspur Park, New Malden (South London), former home of BBC Football Club and other BBC sports facilities. His intent was to apply for planning permission to build a leisure and fitness centre, but he did not do so. Instead, in February 2008, his company Barkisland Developments Limited submitted a planning application to the Royal Borough of Kingston upon Thames Council for change of use of the sports ground to a cemetery. The application to change the former BBC Sports Ground into a cemetery was withdrawn on 3 October 2008. It had become clear that planning permission was likely to be refused. Objections were lodged by many local residents, sports clubs, Sport England and the Mayor of London.

=== BenDunne.com ===
In 2009, Dunne established an online marketplace, BenDunne.com, competing with Buy and Sell, DoneDeal and Adverts.ie. Following its soft opening, the new website was affected by glitches and was unable to handle sufficient traffic without going down. Its official launch was cancelled and the website was taken offline to address the problems. It was relaunched in 2010 but failed within a year. Dunne admitted that "The internet is one of my failures. I can't work it out. I can't get people to advertise on BenDunne.com for nothing and I can't get them to pay €3."

== Personal life and death ==
Ben Dunne was married to Mary, and the couple had a daughter and three sons.

Dunne died in Dubai on 18 November 2023, at the age of 74, of a heart attack.
