= Charlene McMann =

American philanthropist and fraudster

Charlene McMann (b. circa 1951 in Chicago, Illinois) (also known as Charlene McMann-Seaman) is a philanthropist and convicted fraudster who was the co-founder and chief executive officer of the now-defunct Chicago Blood Cancer Foundation (founded 2010), a non-profit raising money for lymphoma, leukemia, and myeloma.

McMann is co-author with her husband Scott Seaman of the self-published book Battling and Beating Cancer – The Cancer Survival Book (2009) and was also co-host with her husband of the Battling and Beating Cancer online-only radio show on BlogTalkRadio and CAN TV public access and online television show.

Previously, McMann co-founded and was president of the Chicago Chapter of the Lymphoma Research Foundation, which was that organization's first local chapter. She received the local Chicago Jefferson Award for Public Service for her cancer advocacy in 2008, organizing, fundraising, and leadership. She subsequently became a Member of the National Board of Selectors of the Jefferson Awards for Public Service and launched a national program to promote health, physical activity, and well-being in students.

She has been serving as an executive board member of the Hippocratic Cancer Research Foundation since 2017.

== Felony plea deal ==
McMann was accused of transferring funds on multiple occasions from the Chicago Blood Cancer Foundation to her own account between 2010 and 2013 while she was executive director. McMann pleaded guilty to a charge of personal use of charitable assets, a felony, on December 1, 2015. She was sentenced on January 27, 2016, to two years' probation and ordered to pay $44,085 to the Chicago-based Cancer Research Foundation, a similar charity.
