= Mahone, West Virginia =

- Unincorporated community
- Location within West Virginia Location within the United States
- Coordinates: 39°06′33″N 81°04′28″W
- Country: United States
- State: West Virginia
- County: Ritchie
- Elevation: 1,037 ft (316 m)
- Time zone: UTC-5 (Eastern (EST))
  - Summer (DST): UTC-4 (EDT)
- Area codes: 304 & 681
- GNIS feature ID: 1549804

Mahone is an unincorporated community in Ritchie County, West Virginia, United States. Mahone is located on West Virginia Route 16, 7 miles (11 km) south of Harrisville.
