= Thomas and Bridget Shanahan McMahon House =

Historic house in Minnesota, United States

- Thomas Bridget Shanahan McMahon House
- U.S. National Register of Historic Places
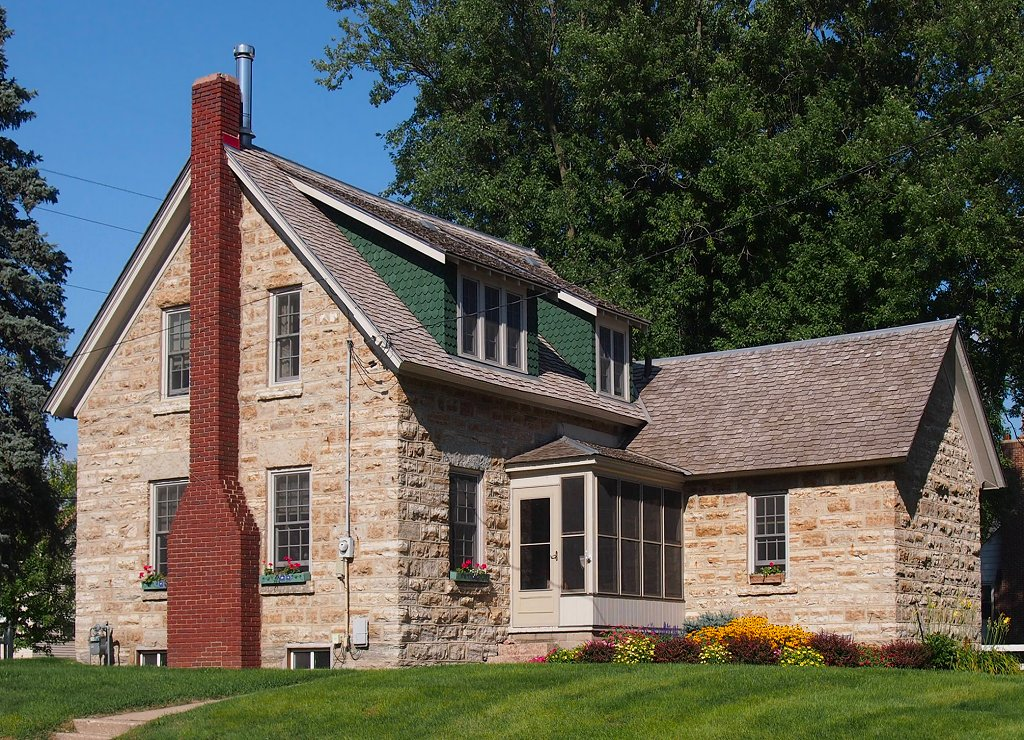
- The McMahon house from the southwest

- Location within Minnesota Location within the United States
- Location: 603 Division St., E., Faribault, Minnesota
- Coordinates: 44°17′25″N 93°15′30″W
- Area: less than one acre
- Built: 1870–1
- Architect: McMahon, Thomas
- Architectural style: Faribault stone architecture
- NRHP reference No.: 90001112
- Added to NRHP: July 19, 1990

The Thomas and Bridget Shanahan McMahon House, located at 603 Division St., E., in Faribault, Minnesota was built in 1870–1871, and was listed for its Faribault stone architecture on the National Register of Historic Places on July 19, 1990. It was built by Thomas McMahon, a local quarry owner.

Thomas McMahon married Bridget Shanahan in 1849, while they lived in Iowa. The McMahons had 12 children. Three died in infancy. They moved to Faribault in 1856, where Thomas became a quarry owner. He spent $1200 on their house in 1870, and $1000 more finishing it in 1871. The house has a great room and kitchen on floor one and two bedrooms and a bath on floor two. The house originally did not have dormers or an external chimney. It had two internal fireplaces at each east west side. The small porch by the back door is also not original. It originally had a magnificent wooden, hand painted porch on the front. Sometime after 1940, that was lost. Current owners are making an effort to replicate the porch and put it back on.
