= Mercy University Hospital =

- Health Service Executive
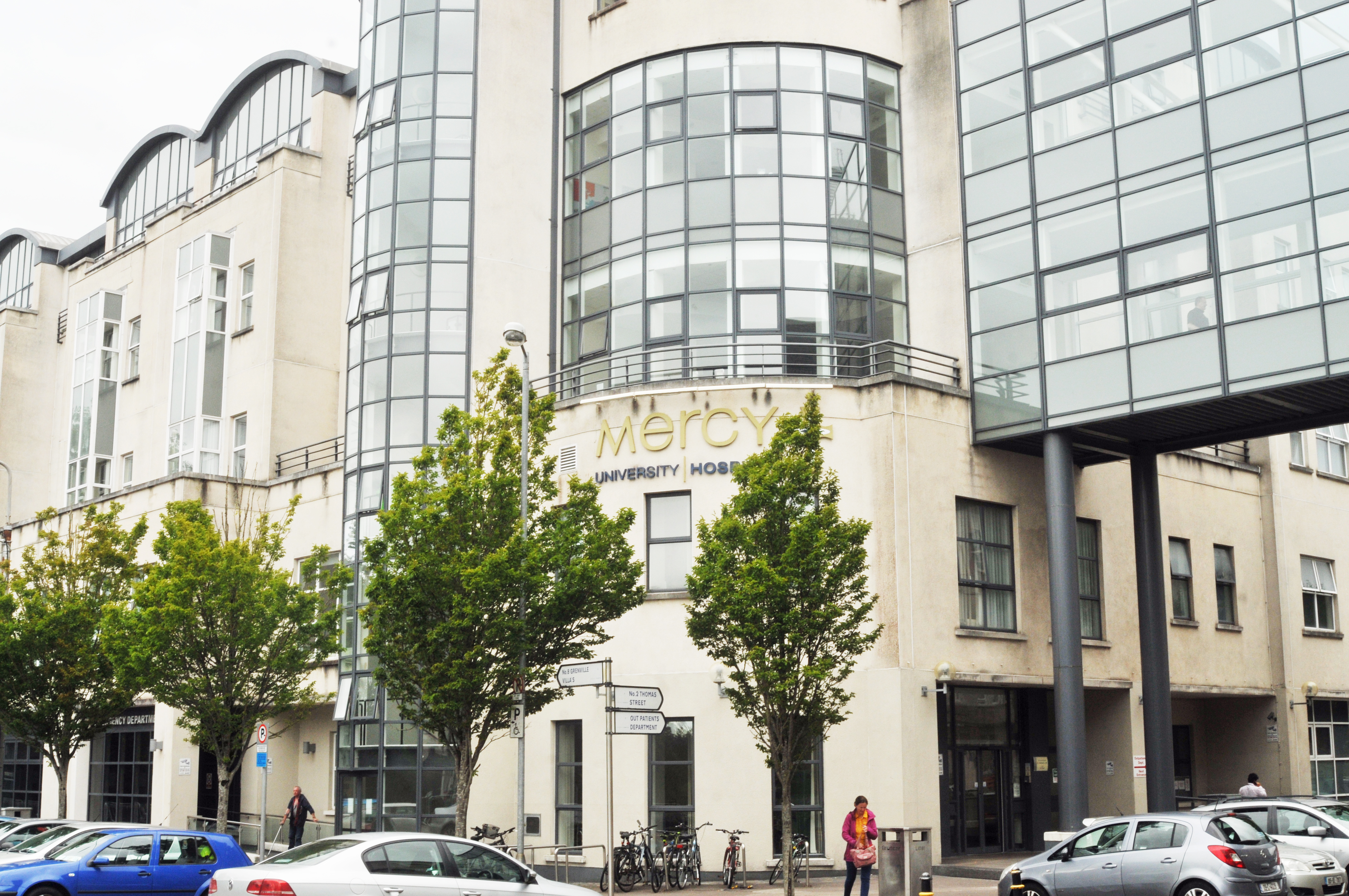
- Mercy University Hospital

- Shown in Ireland

Geography
- Location: Cork, Ireland
- Coordinates: 51.9000087°N 8.4827249°W

Organisation
- Type: Teaching

Services
- Emergency department: Yes
- Beds: 330

History
- Founded: 1857

Links
- Website: www.muh.ie

Mercy University Hospital (Irish: Ospidéal Ollscoile na Trócaire) (MUH) is a general hospital located in Cork, Ireland. It is managed by HSE Regional Health Authority-South West.

== History ==
The hospital was established by the Sisters of Mercy on 17 March 1857. However, the oldest part of the building dates back to the 1760s, as the residence of the Mayor of Cork, and was temporarily used as a school before being converted into a hospital. Mercy University Hospital originally contained only 40-beds, but has since grown to its current number of over 300.
