= Dunnes Stores =

Irish multinational retail chain

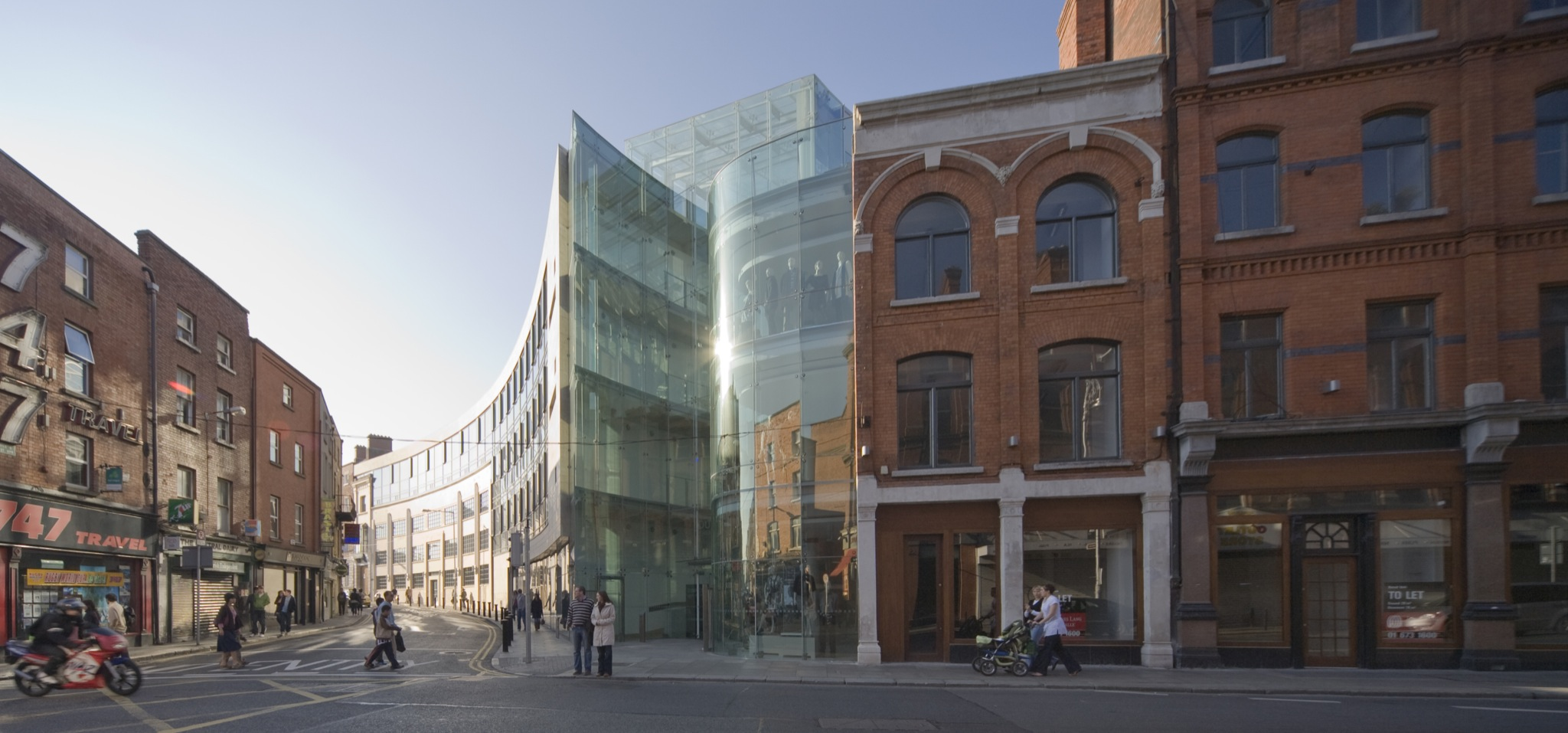
- Head offices in Dublin
- Type: Private
- Industry: Retail
- Founded: 1944; 82 years ago
- Founder: Ben Dunne
- Headquarters: 46–50 South Great George's Street, Dublin 2, D02 RX86
- Number of locations: 138 shops (118 in the Republic of Ireland, 15 in Northern Ireland and 5 in Spain)
- Area served: Republic of Ireland, Northern Ireland, Spain
- Key people: Margaret Heffernan, Anne Heffernan, Sharon McMahon (Directors)
- Products: Groceries and textiles
- Owner: Dunne family (100%)
- Number of employees: Approx. 18,000
- Website: dunnesstores.com

Dunnes Stores is an Irish multinational retail chain that primarily sells food, clothes and household wares. It was founded by Ben Dunne in 1944. In addition to its main customer base in Ireland, the chain also has operations in Spain. The format of most of the chain's shops in Ireland involves a grocery supermarket operating alongside a clothing/textiles shop, although some shops contain only textiles and some contain only a supermarket. The grocery side of the business does not operate outside of Ireland, save for a limited grocery range in the Spanish shops and Northern Ireland. The larger shops usually contain a café branded as either Café Sol or Dunnes Stores Café.

Dunnes Stores' original own brand of groceries was sold under the St Bernard brand introduced in 1956, becoming an Irish household name, but was rebranded as "My Family Favourites" in 2013.

The main domestic competitors in the supermarket business are Tesco (formerly Quinnsworth), SuperValu, Lidl and Aldi. Since first opening, Dunnes Stores has consistently maintained a top-three market share in Ireland's grocery market, formerly alongside Quinnsworth and currently alongside SuperValu and Tesco. Combined, Dunnes, Tesco and SuperValu currently account for approximately 70% of Ireland's grocery market. Currently, Dunnes Stores is Ireland’s number one supermarket, holding this title since 2018.

In clothing, their rivals include Penneys and Marks and Spencer. Dunnes collaborate for many clothing/home wares collections from a number of Irish designers such as Paul Costelloe, Pádraig Harrington, Carolyn Donnelly, Joanne Hynes and Paul Galvin. They also sell in-house clothing brands such as Savida and Gallery, along with their own Dunnes Stores brand of clothing.

== History ==
=== 1940s–1950s ===
Bernard "Ben" Dunne began his retail career as an employee at Anderson's drapery shop in Drogheda, Ireland, in 1926. He later worked in Cameron's drapery shop in Longford town. In the mid-1930s, Dunne moved to Roches Stores in Cork. He rose to become a senior buyer for Roches Stores. When he was asked to oversee Roches' entire drapery business, he agreed on condition that he receive a pay rise. The owners refused, noting that he would be earning more than any of them. Dunne decided to leave Roches Stores and set up his own business.

Dunne, together with his friend Des Darrer, opened his first drapery shop across the road from Roches Stores on St Patrick’s Street, Cork on 31 March 1944, promising "better value" by offering goods at pre-war prices.

The business expanded in the late 1940s, opening new shops on Cathedral Street, Waterford on 8 August 1946 and on North Main Street, Cork and in Mallow in 1947.

Dunne and Darrer continued as partners until 1952, when they dissolved the partnership and Darrer took ownership of the Waterford shop, initially continuing to trade under the Dunnes Stores name before renaming it Darrers in 1966.

Dunnes opened shops on O'Connell Street, Limerick in 1954 and in Wexford in 1955.

During the 1950s, Dunnes began to take its first small steps towards entering the grocery market, selling boxes of apples and oranges from its shop on St Patrick's Street, Cork.

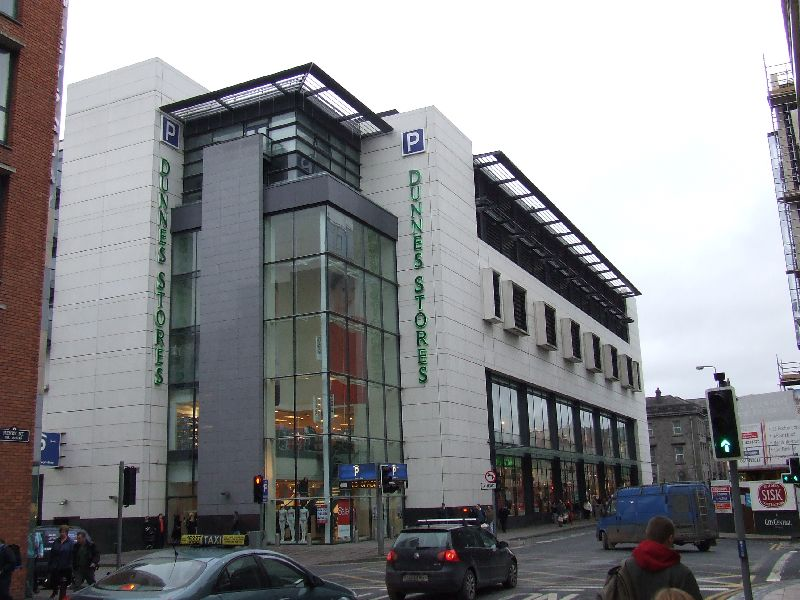
Dunnes Stores on Harvey's Quay, Limerick

Dunnes introduced its own-brand range in 1956, then branded as St Bernard (using its founder's first name), modelled on the Marks & Spencer St Michael brand.

Dunnes opened its first Dublin shop, on Henry Street, in 1957.

=== 1960s–1970s ===
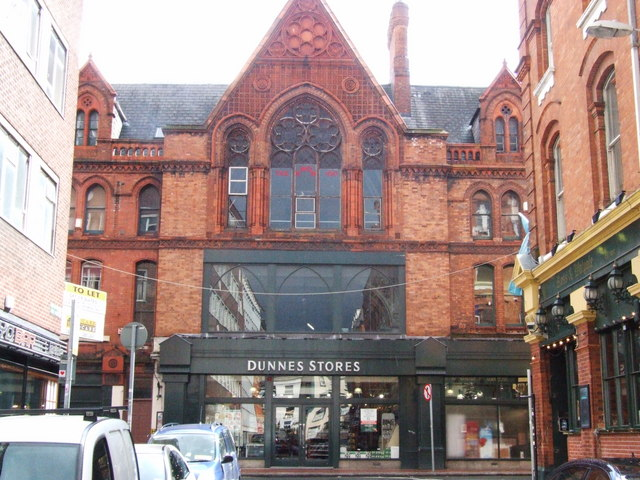
Dunnes Stores on South Great George's Street, Dublin

Dunne opened a large shop on South Great George's Street, Dublin in 1960. This shop allowed customers to browse through items on racks before making a purchase, which was new to Irish retail.

Dunnes continued to expand during the 1960s, and in 1963, Dunne grouped his growing number of shops under a new corporate structure, Dunnes Holding Company, which took over ownership of the entire operation. He also set up a family trust at the same time, in part to ensure that the company remained family controlled.

In the early 1960s, Dunnes began to gradually expand its small grocery offering, adding cream crackers and cheese to its limited range.

On 31 December 1963, Dunne announced the purchase of Anderson's department store in Drogheda, where he had served his apprenticeship in the 1920s.

In May 1964, Dunnes announced the acquisition of Rowe's drapers on North Earl Street, Dublin. Initially it continued to trade under the Rowe's name but it was rebranded as Dunnes Stores shortly thereafter.

In the middle of the decade Dunne sparked a new revolution in the Irish retail scene. Until then, the company's shops had operated, like the country's retail sector in general, in Ireland's city centre. In 1965, however, Dunnes opened a shop at Cornelscourt in what was then Ireland's first out-of-town shopping centre. Although scoffed at by experts, who believed the company would fail at the new location, the Cornelscourt site was not only a success, but became one of the company's flagship shops.

By the end of the 1960s, Dunnes operated 17 shops across Ireland. This increased to 19 by October 1971. The company remained intensely private and, despite an active advertising schedule, wary of publicity. As Ben Dunne explained, in what the Times described as a rare interview in 1971, "If there is one thing I hate it is publicity. No one is allowed to write about Ben Dunne. The people I do not like are the people who talk about what they have done and the people who talk about what they are going to do." In that same interview, Dunne reaffirmed his commitment to maintaining family control of his business, saying: "Public companies are like the government. The government has the privilege of spending money foolishly and public companies are no better."

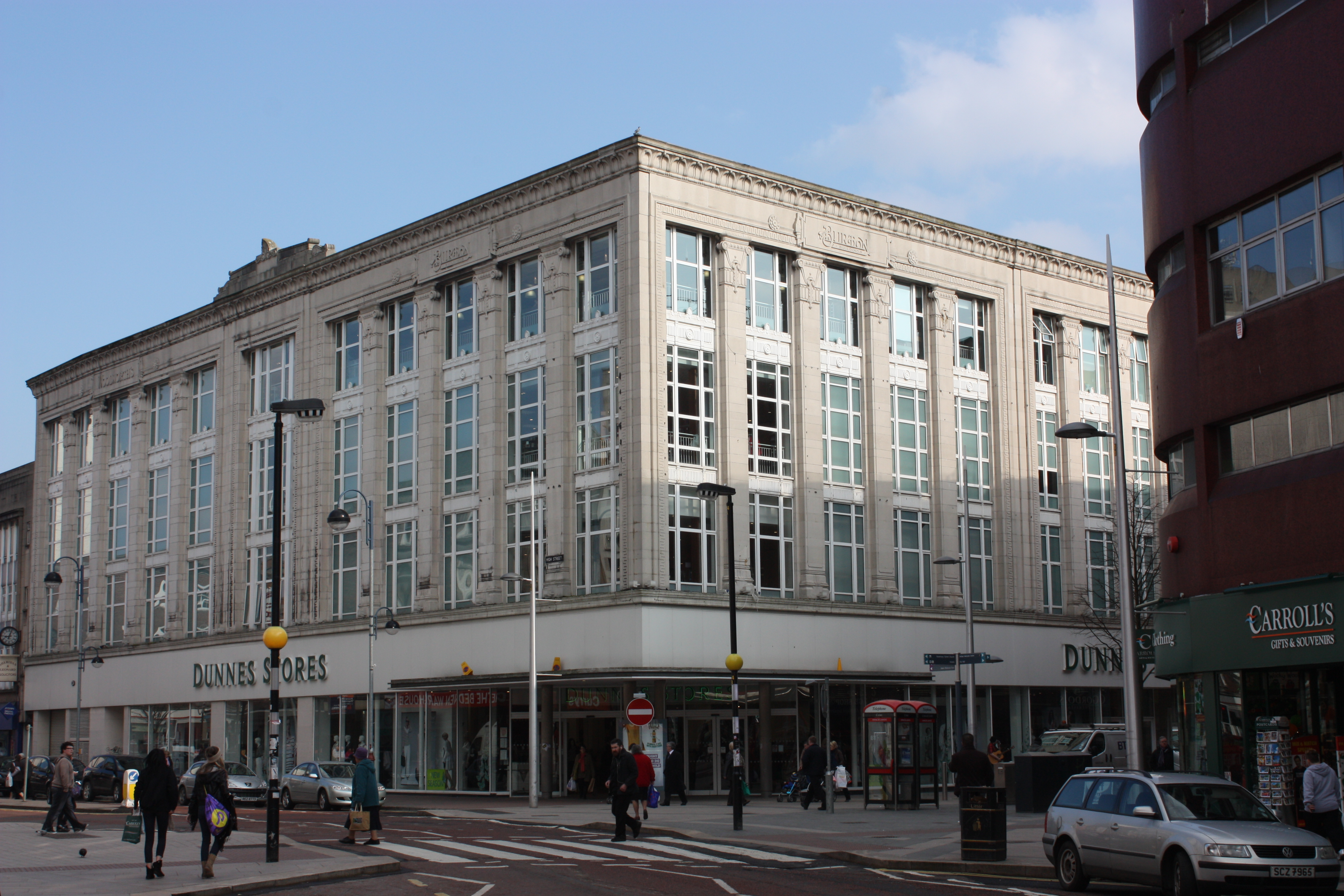
Dunnes Stores on High Street, Belfast

Dunnes added its first shop in Northern Ireland, in Bangor, in 1971.

In 1972, Dunnes Stores bought the Bolger Stores Group chain of drapery shops and House of Cassidy womenswear chain.

In 1978, Dunnes purchased Crumlin Shopping Centre in Dublin, which had been built four years earlier with 41 units including 2 large units, and having Dunnes Stores as anchor.

The company continued to expand its retail business, and by the end of the 1970s, it had built up a network of 61 shops.

=== 1980s–1990s ===
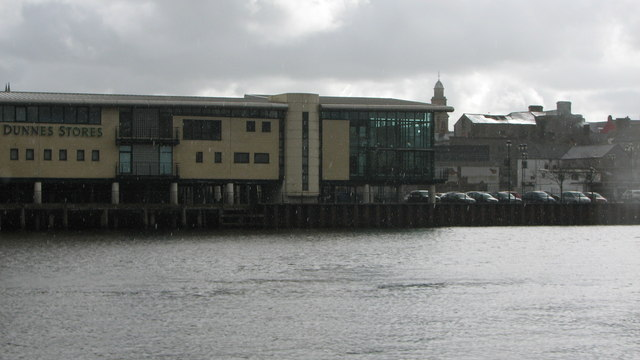
Dunnes Stores on Bannside Wharf, Coleraine

By the beginning of the 1980s, the company operated seven shops in Northern Ireland. It opened a shop in Lisburn in March 1980.

In 1980, Dunnes opened its first shop on the European continent, in Fuengirola in the Costa del Sol in Spain. The success of that venture led the company to begin construction on its second Spanish shop the following year, which opened in Marbella.

By 1981, Dunnes Stores represented 66 locations, producing estimated sales revenues of some £200,000,000, and holding an 8% share of the Irish grocery market. Dunne, by then in his 70s, had succeeded in building his company into one of Ireland's top ten firms. Dunne also had been joined by his five children, Frank, Margaret, Thérèse, Elizabeth, and, especially, youngest son Ben Dunne Jr. The company became swept up in political events in October 1981 when Ben Dunne Jr. was kidnapped and held captive for several days by the IRA.

Ben Dunne Senior died of a heart attack at 4pm on 14 April 1983. At the time of his death, Dunnes Stores had 48 shops in the Republic of Ireland, 10 in the House of Cassidy chain, 18 in Northern Ireland and one in Spain.

After Ben Dunne Senior's death, the business was placed in a Trust for the benefit of all five of his children, most of whom played an active role in the company's operations. His sons, Ben Junior and Frank, became Managing Directors, and his daughters, Margaret, Elizabeth and Therese, were Directors. In practice, it was Ben Dunne Junior who primarily took up leadership the company.

By 1985, Dunnes Stores held a 21% share in the Irish grocery market, with turnover of approximately £460,000,000.

Dunnes expanded into England in 1986.

By 1990, Dunnes Stores's share of the Irish grocery market had increased to 24%.

In 1990, Dunnes closed the drapery shop it had opened on South Great George's Street in Dublin in 1960, which at the time had been one of Ireland's first self-selection drapery shops.

In November 1990, a price war broke out amongst the main supermarkets. Dunnes introduced a voucher scheme offering £6 off every £30 spent. The Crazy Prices chain (owned by rival Quinnsworth) reacted by accepting Dunnes's vouchers in its own shops. The Quinnsworth chain shortly thereafter introduced its own "£4 off every £25 spent" scheme, and Roches Stores introduced a similar scheme.

In late October 1992, Dunnes introduced a discount scheme giving customers a £5 voucher for every £40 spent. In early November, the Director of Consumer Affairs obtained a High Court injunction putting an end to the scheme, arguing that it was effectively a form of below-cost selling, which was outlawed at the time. Rival Quinnsworth withdrew a similar "£6 off every £40 spent" scheme.

In February 1992, Ben Dunne Junior was arrested for cocaine possession in a Florida hotel. Following the resulting scandal, his siblings ousted him as Chairman of the board of Dunnes Stores in February 1993, resulting in a somewhat public battle among the otherwise publicity-shy family.

In the first year after Ben Dunne Junior's removal as chairman, Dunnes Stores's share of the Irish grocery market fell from 24% to 20%.

Elizabeth died in 1993, leaving her four siblings as directors but leaving her share in the business to her children. Therese died in 1994, leaving the entirety of her 19% share to Margaret, giving her a majority holding in the business.

In order to quantify and document the financial dealings of her brother, Margaret Heffernan commissioned a report from Price Waterhouse accountants, which was eventually disclosed in the legal case between the Dunne siblings.

Following his removal as chairman, Ben Dunne Junior had issued court proceedings against Dunnes Stores, arguing that the Trust that nominally owned most of the business for the benefit of the siblings was null and void (and that he should receive his share of the business directly) and that he was the victim of shareholder oppression on the part of his siblings. The proceedings were ultimately settled on the basis that he would be paid a figure (reported as either £100 or £125 million) to relinquish his share of the business, leaving ownership in the hands of his surviving siblings, Margaret, Frank and Ann, and his late sister Elizabeth's children.

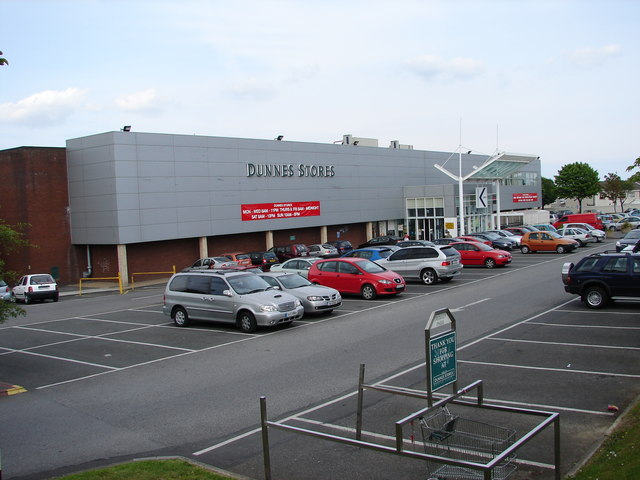
Dunnes Stores in Kilnamanagh, Tallaght

The alleged unorthodoxy of Ben Dunne Junior's business practices, which included funnelling Dunnes Stores funds into the offshore bank accounts of a number of Irish political figures, brought the company once again into the limelight in the late-1990s. The resulting political scandal had an additional consequence for the very private company, when the government announced in 1997 that it would appoint an authorised officer to inquire into the company's business practices under Ben Dunne Jr.

In March 1997, UK supermarket giant Tesco entered the Irish market by purchasing the Quinnsworth, Crazy Prices and Stewart's Supermarkets chains, posing significant competition to Dunnes by its greater size and economies of scale.

Dunnes introduced its loyalty card scheme in 1997.

German discounter supermarket Aldi entered the Irish market in 1999, followed shortly afterwards by Lidl with its similar model in 2000. The arrival of the German discounters placed Dunnes's own discount formula under significant pressure.

In late 1999, Dunnes was said to have held buyout talks in 2000 with U.S. retail giant Wal-Mart, which owns the Asda supermarket chain, which operates in Northern Ireland. Walmart wished to combine its Asda operations with Dunnes in order to increase buying power and profits. The Dunne family, however, declined and decided to retain control of their business.

=== 2000s–2010s ===
Dunnes logo from 2009 until 2014

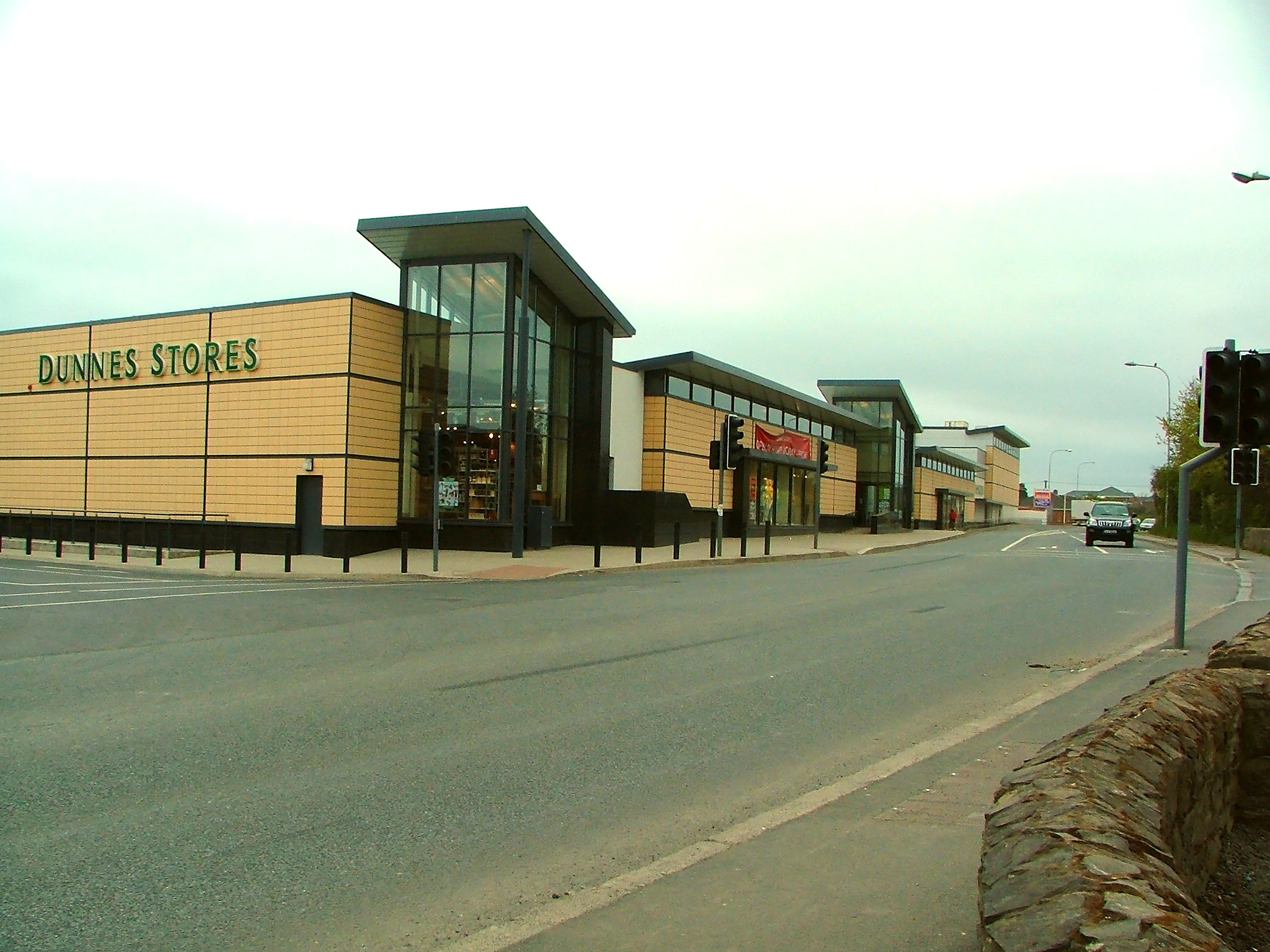
Dunnes Stores in Ashbourne

By March 2000, Dunnes had some 119 outlets, with 81 in the Republic of Ireland, 26 in Northern Ireland, 9 in Great Britain and 3 in Spain.

Dunnes expanded into the Scottish market in 2000, opening a shop in Glasgow. It announced its intention to expand its presence in the United Kingdom by up to 25 shops by 2005.

In 2000, the business re-opened its unit on South Great George's Street in Dublin, this time as a grocery shop in a new format, adapting the American-style convenience shop concept for the Dublin market. By 2001, the company had opened a second shop featuring the smaller format and had registered a new subsidiary name, Better Value Conveniently Yours Ltd., in what some observers interpreted as an intention to expand its convenience shop operations. In the meantime, Dunnes continued to open new shops, bringing its total to 125. It opened its 126th shop on Henry Street in Limerick on 20 November 2001, again with a focus on convenience, "heat and eat", products in its grocery shop on the ground floor, with its drapery department located upstairs.

In 2003, the Irish government appointed an authorised officer to look into Dunnes Stores' records. While the results of that investigation were to remain private, it represented a new intrusion for the company's carefully guarded privacy. That same desire for privacy had reportedly led the company to quash a story slated to appear about Dunnes Stores in the Irish Independent, which allegedly chose not to run the story in order to safeguard the yearly €1.6 million in advertising revenues provided by Dunnes Stores.

In 2007, Dunnes refurbished its shop at Henry Street, Dublin. The same year, architect Arthur Gibney & Partners designed a large commercial development on South Great George's Street, Dublin as a headquarters for the business, which entailed the removal of some buildings and facade retention of several others, including the former Dunlop Factory on Stephen Street, and the Connolly Shoes building. The building has a dramatic glass corner atrium leading to an internal street through the development. The facade to George's Street respects existing building heights.

In 2011, rival Superquinn, which had positioned itself at the upper end of the grocery market, was acquired from receivership by Musgrave Group, and all of its supermarkets were rebranded as SuperValu in 2014.

In 2015, Dunnes acquired the retail operations of James Whelan butchers. They also acquired the Café Sol chain in the same year, which includes itself, Baxter & Greene and 50% of the Asian fast-food chain, Neon.

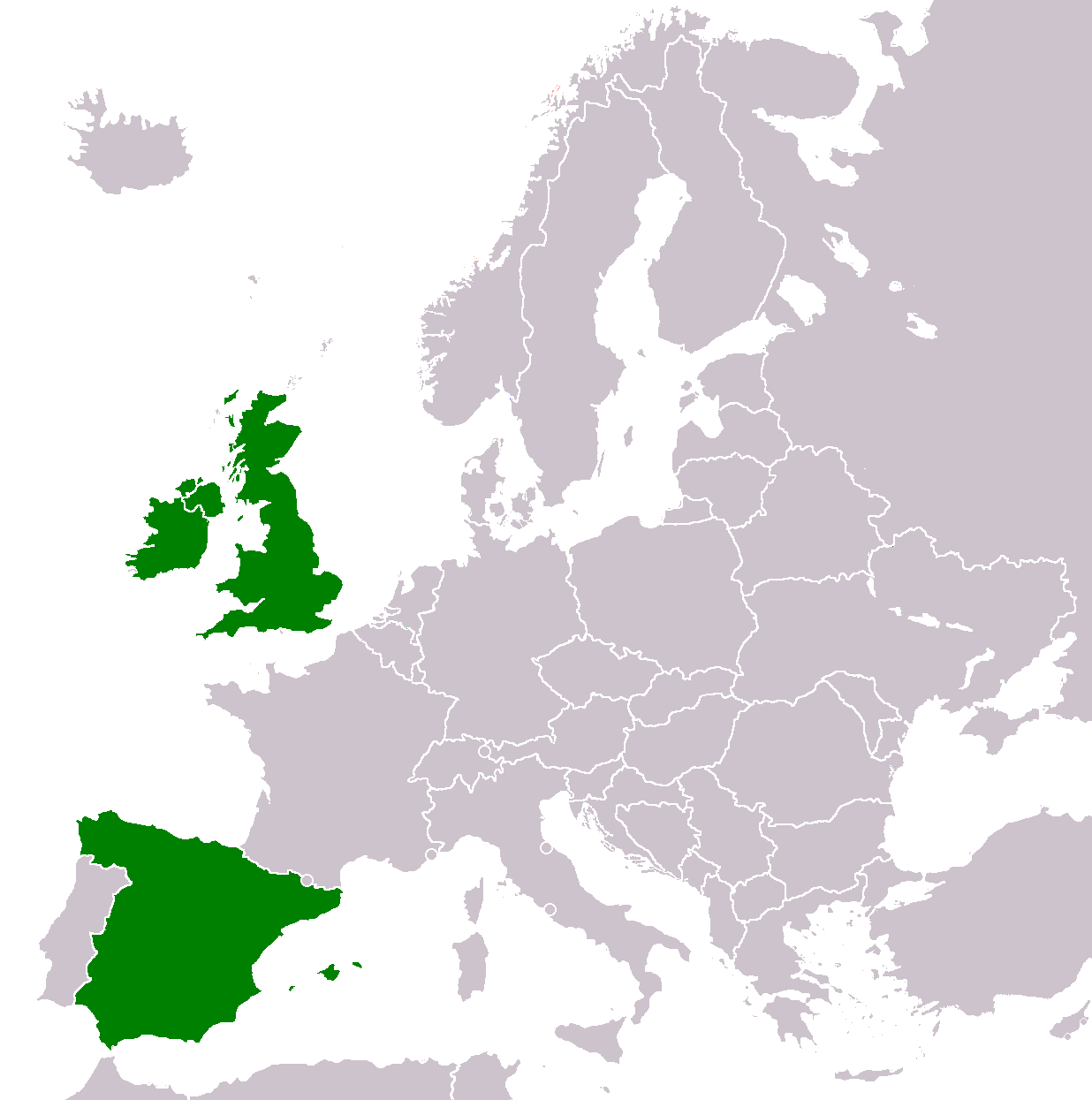
Countries with Dunnes Stores locations (in the United Kingdom, only operating in Northern Ireland)

Following the United Kingdom voting to leave the European Union in 2016, and anticipating a consequent downturn in the UK economy, Dunnes decided to cease its operations in Great Britain. In spring 2018, Dunnes Stores confirmed the closure of all its shops in England and Scotland, limiting its UK presence to Northern Ireland only.

In 2018, Dunnes Stores commenced a number of substantial refurbishments and expansions on some of its shops, including its shops in Bishopstown and Ballyvolane in Cork and in a number of shops in Dublin including Donaghmede, Blanchardstown and Swords. The refurbished supermarkets now contain a number of concessions including James Whelan Butchers, Sheridan's Cheesemongers and Baxter & Greene Markets Delis.

In 2019, new shops opened in Naas and Ilac Centre, and the Jetland and Briarhill shops were refurbished, with the refurbished Jetland shop including Dunnes Stores's first beauty department.

In 2019, Dunnes acquired the JC Savage supermarket in Swords, Dublin, which continued to trade under the JC's brand before being rebranded as Dunnes Stores.

=== 2020s ===
Dunnes Stores introduced a voucher scheme known as “Shop & Save”, whereby customers who spend between €25 and €50 receive a €5 voucher for their next shop, and customers who spend €50 or more receive a €10 voucher for their next shop. This has earned Dunnes Stores a loyal customer following.

In March 2020, Dunnes Stores introduced priority shopping for the elderly and vulnerable between 11:00-13:00, in response to the high volume of customer traffic in the mornings, a result from the COVID-19 pandemic where panic buying became an issue across Ireland.

In 2023, Dunnes Stores opened a new shop in Point Square, Dublin, extensively refurbished its Henry Street shop for a second time, and acquired and rebranded Condron's SuperValu in Clane, Co. Kildare.

In 2024, Dunnes partnered with Maxol to trial some of its Simply Better range in Maxol's forecourt shops nationwide.

In February 2025, Dunnes Stores began demolishing Crumlin Shopping Centre, which it had purchased in 1978 and in which its own supermarket had been the anchor unit and was the only remaining business, to facilitate the redevelopment of the site and the construction of a new, larger shopping centre.

In October 2025, Dunnes Stores's shop on West Street, Drogheda, where Ben Dunne Senior had served his apprenticeship in the 1920s before buying the shop in the 1960s, closed. Supermarkets in Dublin Cornelscourt and Ilac Centre, both of which were very near other Dunnes sites, also closed in October 2025. In 2026, Dunnes won three stars in the Guild of Fine Food's Great Taste awards for its own-brands Creamy & Nutty Gubbeen Cheese and Simply Better Handmade Sticky Toffee Pudding Crown products.

Ann Dunne died on 17 October 2026, leaving chief executive Margaret Heffernan as the sole surviving child of founder Ben Dunne Senior.

== Controversies ==
=== South Africa boycott ===
In 1984, Mary Manning, a shop worker in the Henry Street, Dublin branch, made international headlines when she led a picket for almost three years against the sale by Dunnes of fruit sourced from South Africa, then governing under a system of apartheid. Ewan MacColl wrote a song about the issue. The Irish Government eventually banned all imports from South Africa until the end of apartheid. The workers met African National Congress leader and political prisoner Nelson Mandela on the occasion of his conferral of the Freedom of the City of Dublin in 1990. A plaque presented by President of South Africa Thabo Mbeki, commemorating the action, was unveiled in Dublin in June 2008, and a street has been named after Manning in Johannesburg. Manning was invited to attend the Funeral of Nelson Mandela in 2013.

=== Bras for children ===
In September 2011, the Irish Independent found that Dunnes Stores was selling bra-and-knicker sets for three to six-year-old girls. Dunnes also had padded bras for girls with a 28 to 30-inch chest, which are the typical measurements of nine-year-old girls.

=== Burma boycott ===
A boycott was attempted on Dunnes in 1997 due to reports of selling goods made in Burma.

=== Mandate dispute ===
On 2 April 2015, members of the Mandate Trade Union had a one-day dispute at 109 branches of Dunnes Stores. The dispute concerned low-hour contracts (typically 15 hours per week), income and employment security, and the continued failure of Dunnes Stores to recognise or engage with the Mandate Trade Union, contrary to the recommendations of the Labour Court.

=== Vacant sites ===
Dunnes Stores has been criticised for leaving large supermarket premises vacant after closure rather than leasing or selling them to other businesses, contributing to urban dereliction in Tralee, Kilkenny, Wexford and Limerick.
