= Murphy's Brewery =

Brewery in Cork, Ireland

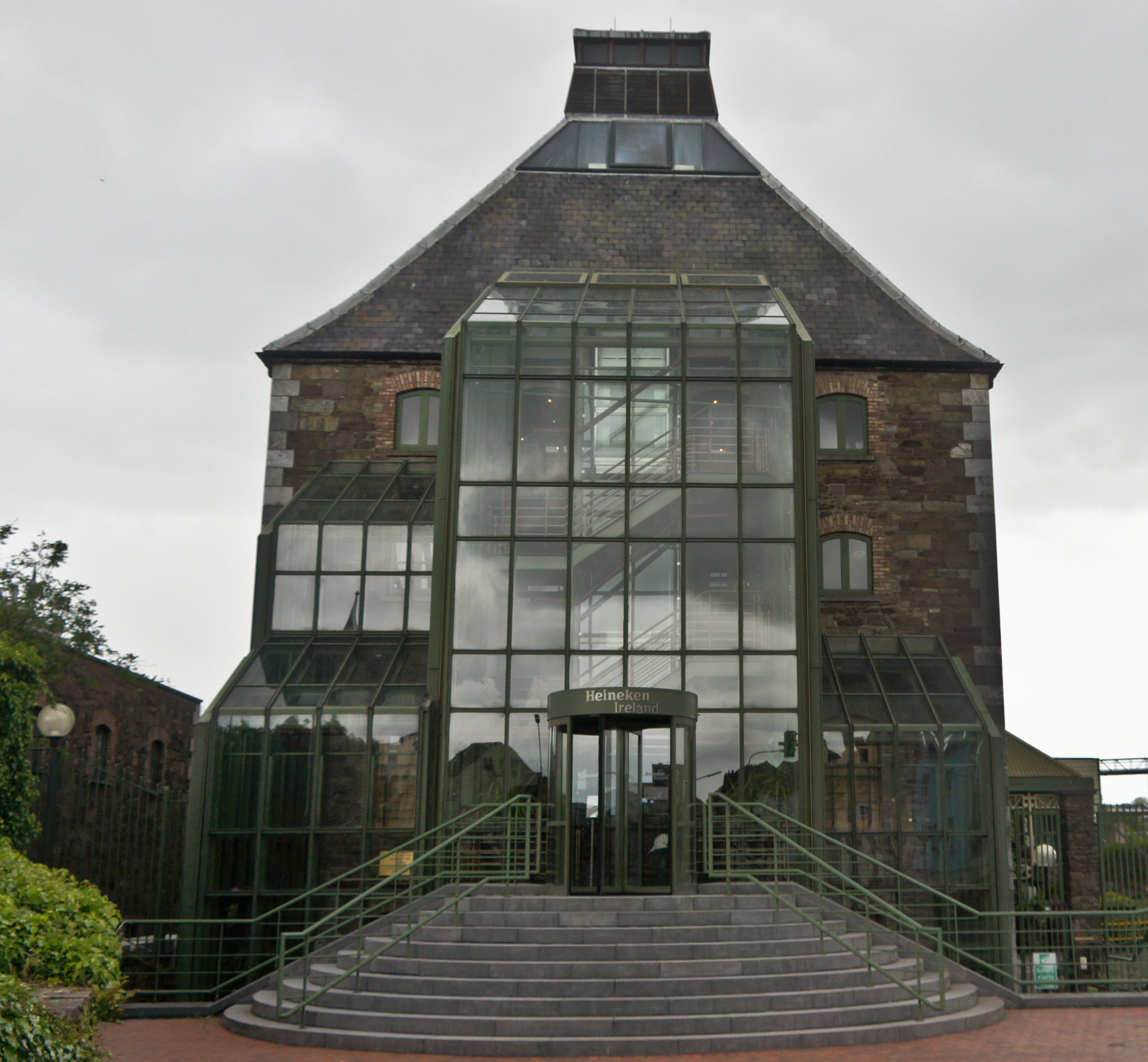
- Lady's Well Brewery in 2011
- Trade name: Heineken Brewery Ireland, Ltd.
- Industry: Brewing
- Founded: 1856
- Founder: James J. Murphy
- Headquarters: Cork, Ireland
- Products: Beer
- Owner: Heineken N.V.
- Website: murphys.com

Murphy's Brewery, later known as Heineken Brewery Ireland, Ltd, was founded in Cork, Ireland, in 1856 by James J. Murphy. By 1906, Murphy's Brewery was Ireland's second largest brewer after Guinness. It was known as Lady's Well Brewery until it was purchased by Heineken N.V. in 1983, when the name changed to Murphy Brewery Ireland Ltd. The name of the brewery was changed to Heineken Brewery Ireland, Ltd in 2001. The brewery produces Heineken, Murphy's Irish Stout and other Heineken products for the Irish market.

== Beers ==
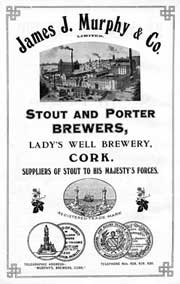
1919 advert for Murphy's Cork brewery

=== Murphy's Stout ===
Murphy's Irish Stout is a dry stout, brewed to be less bitter than its chief competitor, Guinness. It is sometimes described as having a slightly nutty flavour, with "coffee undertones". The manufacturers had a television advertising campaign in the 1990s which played on Murphy's positioning as less bitter than its competitors, in which the strapline was "like the Murphy's, I'm not bitter".

=== Irish Red ===
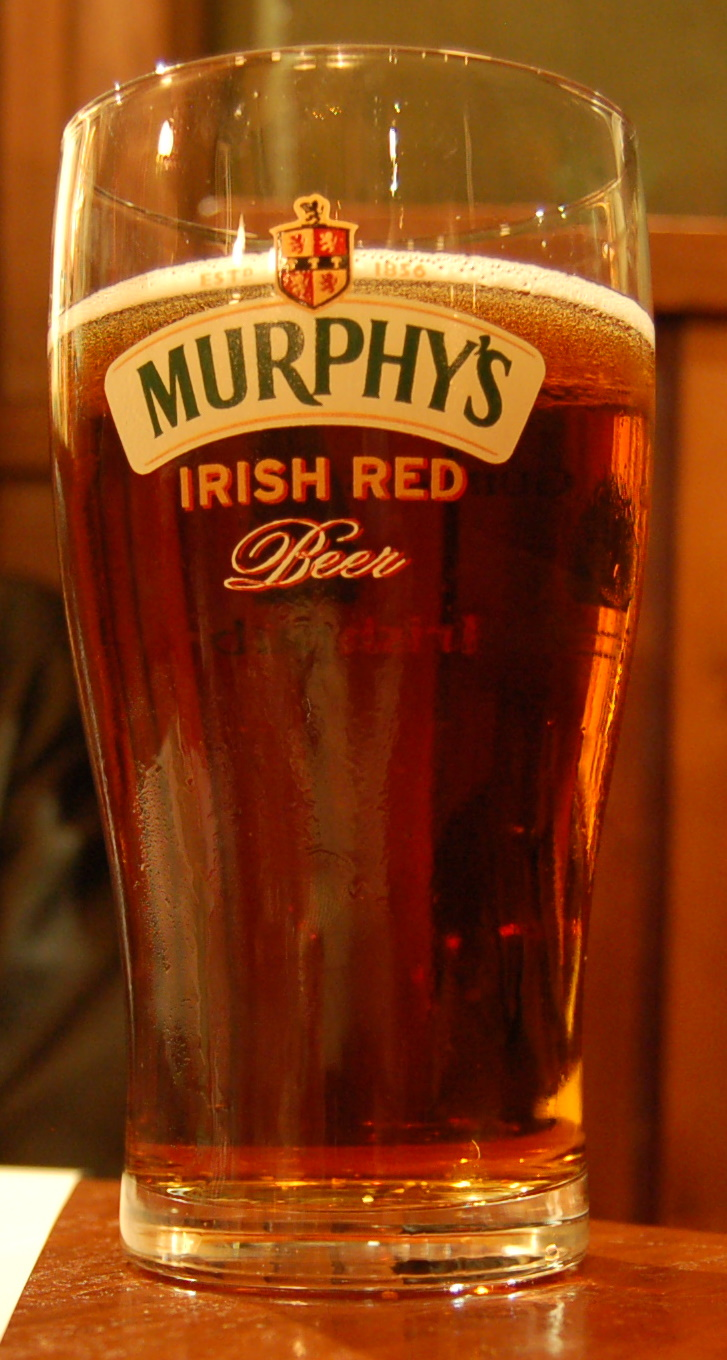
A pint glass of Murphy's Irish Red

In 1983, after the Murphy's brand was bought by Dutch brewer Heineken International, "Irish Red" was launched for the export market, as it was hoped that it would be more popular than stout overseas.
