= Ben Dunne (businessman, born 1908) =

Founder of Dunnes Stores

- Born: Bernard Dunn; 1908; Rostrevor, County Down, Ireland
- Died: 14 April 1983 (aged 74); Cork, Ireland
- Known for: Founder of Dunnes Stores
- Spouse: Nora Maloney (m. 1939)
- Children: 6, including Ben and Margaret

Bernard Dunne (1908 – 14 April 1983) was an Irish businessman who was the founder and chairman of Dunnes Stores.

== Early life ==
Ben Dunne was born as Bernard Dunn in the village of Rostrevor in County Down, Ireland, in 1906. He a was the eldest son of Margaret (née Byrne) and Barney Dunn, a businessman. Dunne's father inherited the Woodside Restaurant Temperance Refreshment Rooms and an auctioneering firm, and his mother ran a drapery business and later a shipping agency. Dunne attended St Mary's School, Rostrevor, until he was 14 years old. While still in school he took on a number of jobs, including repairing bicycles, rearing sheep, and working as a boot-boy at the home of Sir John Foster George Ross of Bladensburg. He was convinced not to emigrate to the United States by a family friend, Edward Whitaker, a native of Killucan in County Westmeath and the father of T. K. Whitaker.

== Career ==
Dunne moved to Drogheda in the newly established Irish Free State in 1926. He was employed as an apprentice first in Anderson's of West Street, Drogheda, and later in Cameron's Drapery store in Longford. It was after his move to Longford that he added an "e" to his surname. In the mid 1930s, he moved to Cork, where he worked as a buyer for Roches Stores in the menswear department. In 1944, Dunne left Roches Stores to open a drapery shop with his friend, Des Darrer, across the road from Roches Stores on St Patrick's Street. Dunne and Darrer would remain in partnership until 1952, when it was dissolved and Darrer took ownership of the Waterford Dunnes Stores, renaming it Darrers.

Dunnes opened a second branch of his new Dunnes Stores on North Main Street, Cork, which were followed by stores in Waterford and Mallow. The tenth store, in Wexford, opened in 1955, and the first store in Dublin opened in 1958. In 1960, Dunne launched the store's first own-brand product, a ladies jacket under the label St Bernard, modelled on the Marks & Spencer St Michael brand. By 1964, Dunnes Stores had expanded into grocery and had an annual turnover of £6 million. Dunne purchased two other Dublin stores, Bolger's and Cassidy's, in 1972 which had 11 shops across Dublin combined. Dunnes Stores opened its first branch in Northern Ireland in 1976.

== Personal life and death ==
Dunne met his wife, Nora Maloney, while working at Roches Stores. They were married in September 1939 and had six children, including Margaret, Frank, Elizabeth, Therese, and Ben. Ben and later Margaret went on to work in the family business. Dunne died on 14 April 1983.
