= McMahon =

McMahon or MacMahon (/məkˈmæn/ mək-MAN or /məkˈmɑːn/ mək-MAHN) may refer to:

== Places ==
- Division of McMahon, an electorate for the Australian House of Representatives
- McMahon, Saskatchewan, a hamlet in Canada
- McMahon Line, a boundary between India and China
- McMahons Point, a suburb of Sydney, Australia
  - McMahons Point ferry wharf, its wharf
- McMahon Stadium, in Calgary, Alberta, Canada

== People ==
- McMahon (surname)
- McMahon family
- MacMahon family
- McMahon clans
- MacMahon brothers
- William McMahon, a former Prime Minister of Australia
- Vince McMahon, former chairman of WWE.

== Other ==
- McMahon Act, or the Atomic Energy Act of 1946
- McMahon government
- McMahon killings
- McMahon ministry
- McMahon system tournament, a tournament pairing system invented for Go competitions
- McMahon-Hussein Correspondence, an exchange of letters during World War I concerning the fate of the Middle East
- MacMahon's master theorem
- Mathgamain mac Cennétig
- Macmahon Holdings, an Australian infrastructure and mining company.
- MV Empire MacMahon

== See also ==
- McMahon House (disambiguation)
- Mahon (disambiguation)
