= Douglas, Cork =

Suburb in Cork city, Ireland

Douglas Dúglas
- Suburb (village core)
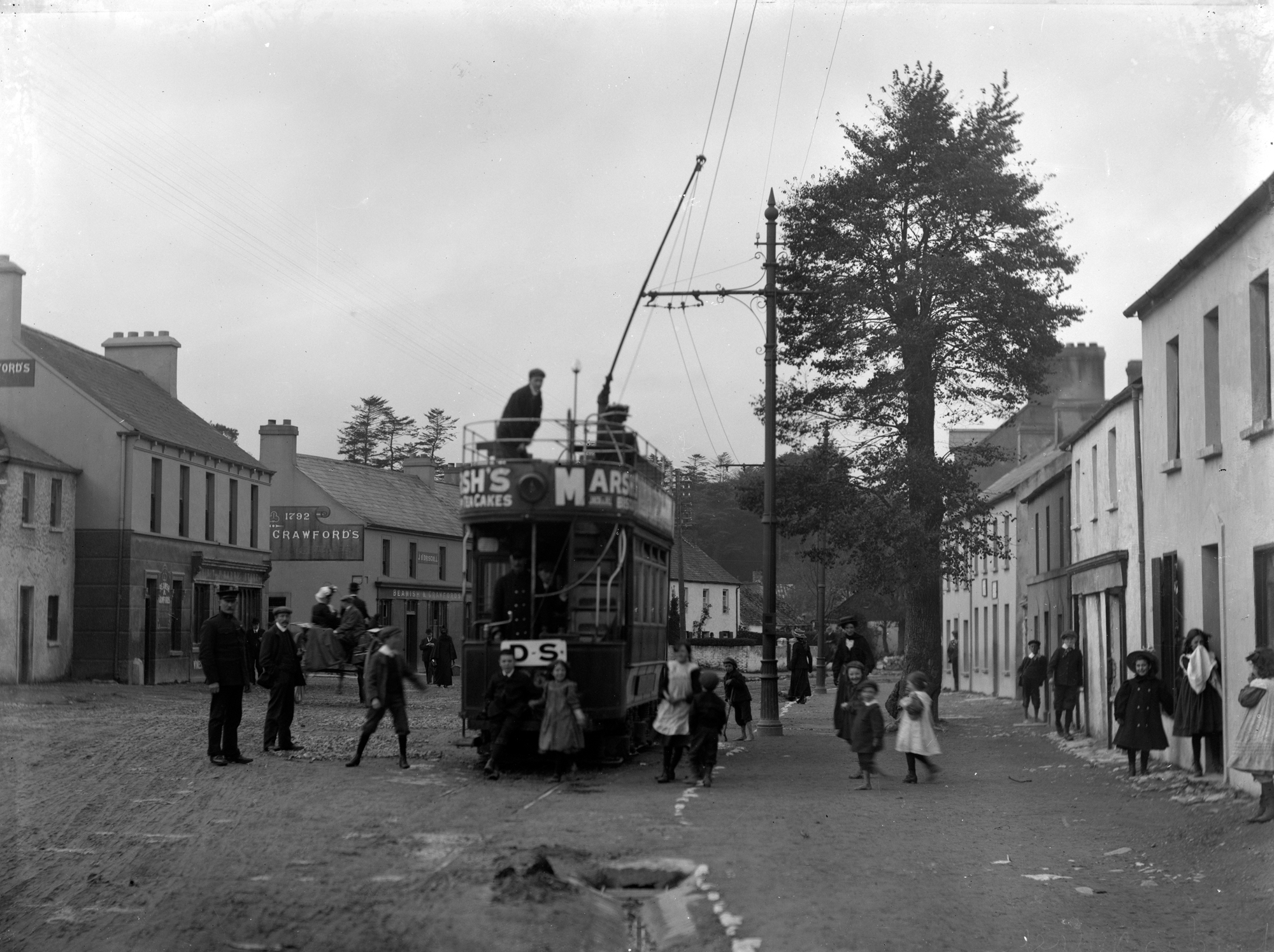
- Douglas at the turn of the 20th century, with a Cork Electric Tramways and Lighting Company tram

- Location in Ireland
- Coordinates: 51°52′35″N 8°26′9″W
- Country: Ireland
- Province: Munster
- Local authority: Cork City Council

Population (2016)
  - Total: 26,883
- approx.
- Time zone: UTC+0 (WET)
  - Summer (DST): UTC-1 (IST (WEST))

Douglas (Irish: Dúglas or Dúbhglas, meaning 'dark stream') is a suburb, with a village core, in Cork city, Ireland. Douglas is also the name of the townland, Roman Catholic parish, Church of Ireland parish and civil parish in which it is contained.

Originally a separate village, the growth of both the village and the city has meant Douglas has become incorporated into the city over time. The 2017 Mackinnon Report proposed that Douglas and surrounding residential areas be moved to within an extended Cork City Council boundary, ending the division of Douglas between the city and county administrative areas. Douglas, along with Rochestown, Grange and Frankfield, formally moved into the city council area on 31 May 2019, following the 2019 local elections.

== History ==
=== Prehistory ===
There are a number of extant or proposed prehistoric sites in Douglas and the surrounding area, including a shell midden, ringforts, souterrains, and a fulacht fiadh. Further evidence of prehistoric settlement in the area includes the finding of a Bronze Age decorated beaten gold disc in the townland of Castletreasure; although reputed to be related to the ruined castle of the same name, it has actually been dated to 2500-2000 BC.

=== Origins (13th-17th century) ===
The first known mention of Douglas is in an inquisition on the lands of Gerald de Prendergast in 1251, and in a 1291 taxation document which records the lands as being an appurtenance of the Church of Bauvier. It is alternately listed as "Duffelglasse" and "Duglasse" in 1302 and 1306, respectively, as part of the parish of Carrigaline. In the year 1603, it became one of the liberties of Cork City. In 1615, parochial records mention the chapel of Douglas being laid waste, reportedly due to theft of the foundation stones, and in a 1700 entry of the same records it is mentioned that the ruined chapel in question had been the church of Carrigaline parish for a century prior to the construction of a new church in Carrigaline itself. By the mid-seventeenth century, it had a population of 308 people (of whom 33 were English) and consisted of a number of large farms.

=== Urbanisation and the linen industry ===
The area began to develop as an urban settlement in the early eighteenth century with the opening of the "Douglas factory" in 1726, reported in August 1755 to be the property of "Messrs. Perry, Carleton and Co.", with 100 looms initially operational. The mills produced sail-cloth and supplied sails to the Royal Navy, amongst other clients. The industry was established by Huguenot weavers and textile workers, such as the Besnards, who acquired the Mills by 1783 and in 1801 installed the first powered spindles in Ireland, along with skilled workers from Ulster and Scotland. In addition to the mill workers, employees included over 1,000 spinners working from their houses, and hacklers, bleachers and labourers tasked with preparing raw material in Douglas village.

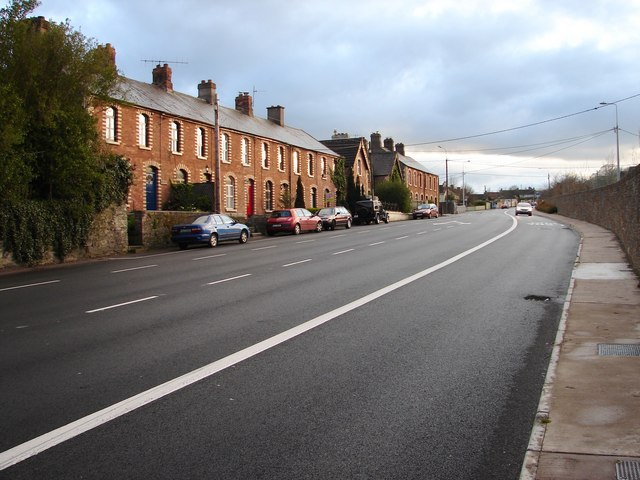
Terrace built for mill workers, Grange Road

Further textile mills opened in the nineteenth century, including an additional Besnard-owned scutching mill (Ravensdale, 1806), Lane's Corn and Hemp Mills (now Douglas Community Park, 1845), O’Brien's Brothers (St Patrick's Woollen Mills, 1882), Donnybrook Mills (Wallis & Pollock Flax Mills, 1866; re-opened as Morroghs' Woolen Mills, 1889/1890) and Conroy's Rope and Twine Mills (now Galway's Lane, 1892). Most of the mills ceased to operate in the early twentieth century, although St Patrick's Woollen Mills and Donnybrook Mills continued to operate until the 1970s. Some of the houses built for the mill workers are still in existence, including a terrace of houses near the junction of the Grange Road and Donnybrook Hill.

Other large businesses of the time included an Osiery beside Conroy's Mills, two large brick manufacturers which straddled the nearby estuary, the Ravensdale Flour Mill, and the Woodville Flour Mill which was situated south of the Rochestown train station and produced sea biscuits and ship bread.

=== Suburban development ===
Douglas developed as a suburban area throughout the later eighteenth century and the nineteenth century, and was noted for the high concentration of 'big houses'. The popularity of the area among the nobility was such that elevated prices were commanded for the surrounding lands, and as a result, the acreage of the estates was lower than average. The oldest house was believed to have been Ronayne's Court, built in 1627 by Morris Ronayne; although the house was demolished in 1969, the original inscribed fireplace was moved to Blackrock Castle. The nearby Montfieldstown House was reputed to be the inspiration for Havisham House of Dickens' Great Expectations, having been abandoned following a ruined wedding. Bloomfield House was connected to a notorious libel case between the prominent Cork Pike and Beamish families, in which the judge, who ruled in favour of Pike in Pike v Beamish, was given the house upon announcement of the verdict by the mother of the plaintiff. Windsor House was occupied by Lord Bandon, Sir Abraham Sutton and the Kiltegan Fathers, before being redeveloped as the Rochestown Park Hotel. Ballybrack House was occupied by the Lane family, also of Vernon Mount, and is the birthplace of art dealer Sir Hugh Lane. It received frequent visits from Lady Gregory, a close relation of the family. High Court, built in 1720 and later known as Westgrove, was the birthplace of playwright and Abbey director Lennox Robinson. Grange House was home of the Conron family, descended from Sir Christopher Hatton, for over 300 years. Douglas Hall, one of the few remaining examples of a slate-fronted house in Ireland, was home to Rev. Dr. Francis Moylan, Bishop of Cork, who was made a freeman for his rhetorical opposition to the French invasion at Bantry Bay during the 1798 Rebellion. Vernon Mount, which was built for a wealthy merchant family in the late 18th century, was occupied by Sir Henry Browne Hayes, who was sentenced to penal servitude in Botany Bay after attempting to abduct an heiress for forced marriage. Other prominent Big Houses included Ravenscourt House, Old Court, Norwood Court, Ballybrack House, Donnybrook House, Montpelier House, Grange Erin, Castletreasure House, Bellvue House, Tramore House (home of the philanthropic Reeves family), and Maryborough House (now the Maryborough House Hotel, with an earlier late-17th century lodge).

Douglas was made a separate Roman Catholic parish sometime before 1768. St Columba's (Roman Catholic) church was built in 1814 by the Rev. Thomas Barry, according to local legend using the stones of the ruined castle of Castletreasure. A Douglas "Chapel of Ease" to the Church of Ireland parish of Carrigaline was established on 17 September 1786, with the establishment of a full separate parish in February 1875. In 1855, the Protestant population of the parish was reported as having been 310, with 150 children attending the parish school. The 1785 church was rebuilt and reconsecrated on 27 August 1875 as St Luke's Church, however, following the death of the resident canon Samuel Hayman in 1886, as well as the principal architect, the church remained without a spire until 1889, with the church bell and tower clock donated by Mary Reeves of Tramore House, with the stipulation that the clock face towards her front door. Notable parishioners interred at St Luke's include the poet Richard Alfred Milliken, the librarian Richard Caulfield and the entrepreneur John Arnott; in addition, a plaque was erected in the memory of art collector Sir Hugh Lane, deceased in the sinking of the Lusitania. The nearby parish of St Finbar's opened a chapel of ease in Frankfield in 1838, later known as the Holy Trinity, on ground donated by Samuel Lane. An additional graveyard, located on Carr's Hill, was opened in 1848 on land donated by the Master of the Workhouse, George Carr, to deal with the increase in deaths from the Great Famine.

In 1898, the Cork Electric Tramways and Lighting Company built a route from Blackpool to Douglas via the city centre. This operated until 1932 when it was replaced by a bus service.

=== Later developments (20th-21st century) ===
In the second half of the twentieth century, Douglas underwent major changes as it became a full-fledged suburb of Cork. New housing was built and the area between Douglas and Cork City became built-up. Schools, shopping centres and other amenities developed to serve this new population. Douglas Community School was built in the late 1960s, and the original Douglas Shopping Centre was completed in 1971. This shopping centre underwent a significant redevelopment at the turn of the 21st century. A second shopping centre, Douglas Court Shopping Centre, was built in the late 1980s and a 5-screen multiplex cinema (since demolished) was also built. Several hotels, including the Rochestown Park Hotel and Maryborough House Hotel, were also developed.

Following the release of the MacKinnon Report in 2017, covering a possible extension of Cork city's boundary, it was proposed that the Douglas area (including Douglas, Frankfield, Grange and Donnybrook) would be moved to the administrative area of Cork City Council. This proposal would move all of Douglas to the city, ending the division of the area between the city and county councils. The boundary change (incorporating parts of Ballincollig, Douglas, Glanmire, and Rochestown within the city boundary) occurred in late May 2019.

== Residential areas ==
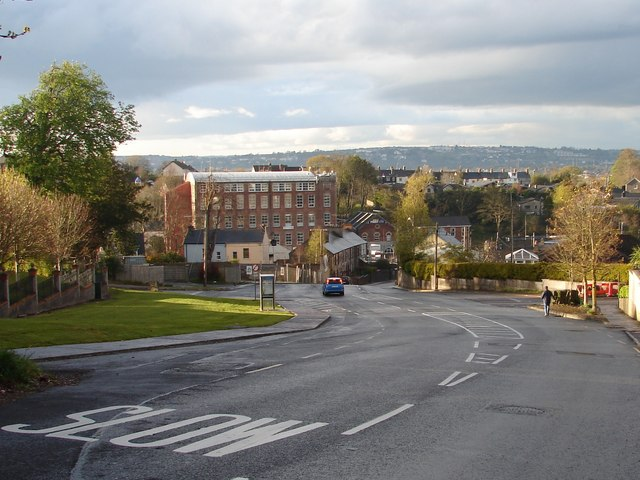
Donnybrook Hill

From the late 19th and into the 20th century, there was an expansion of residential areas in the Douglas catchment. Housing developments (mostly private, with some social housing) were built in Grange, Frankfield, Donnybrook, Maryborough, Rochestown, Mount Oval and along the two main roads connecting Douglas to the city centre, the Douglas Road and the South Douglas Road.

Donnybrook, for example, is south of Douglas village, and has a small supermarket, snooker club, football club (College Corinthians) and forested walkway (at Ballybrack Woods) which serve as amenities for the residential developments in the Donnybrook Hill area.

Grange and Frankfield (encompassed by Frankfield/Grange parish) lie to the west of Douglas village, and are mainly residential areas served by retail outlets, schools (like Scoil Nioclais primary school) and other services.

== Amenities ==
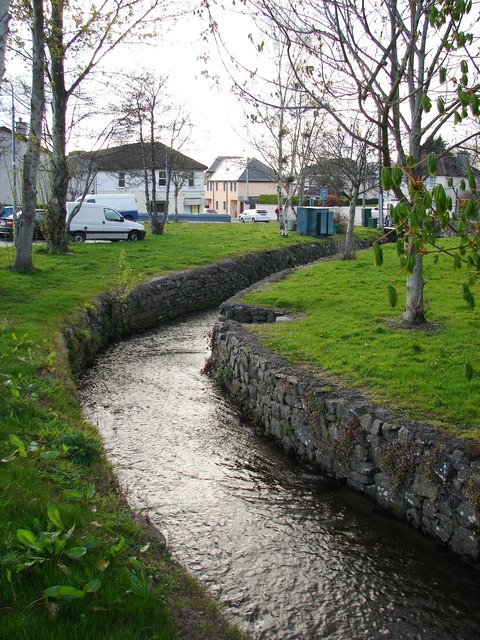
Stream near Douglas Community Park

Amenities and green-spaces in the area include Douglas Community Park (a 5-acre park close to the centre of Douglas which includes a playground), and Ballybrack Woods (a wooded area south of Douglas village which is known locally as 'Mangala'). Douglas has two golf facilities, Douglas Golf Club at Maryborough Hill and a driving range at Frankfield Golf Club.

Following calls to build a pedestrian and cycle trail through the woods around Vernon Mount, with a bridge over the South Ring Road to Tramore Valley Park, a new pedestrian and cycle bridge was opened in November 2023.

There is a Scouting Ireland group based at the John Slye Scout Hall in Douglas.

== Commerce ==
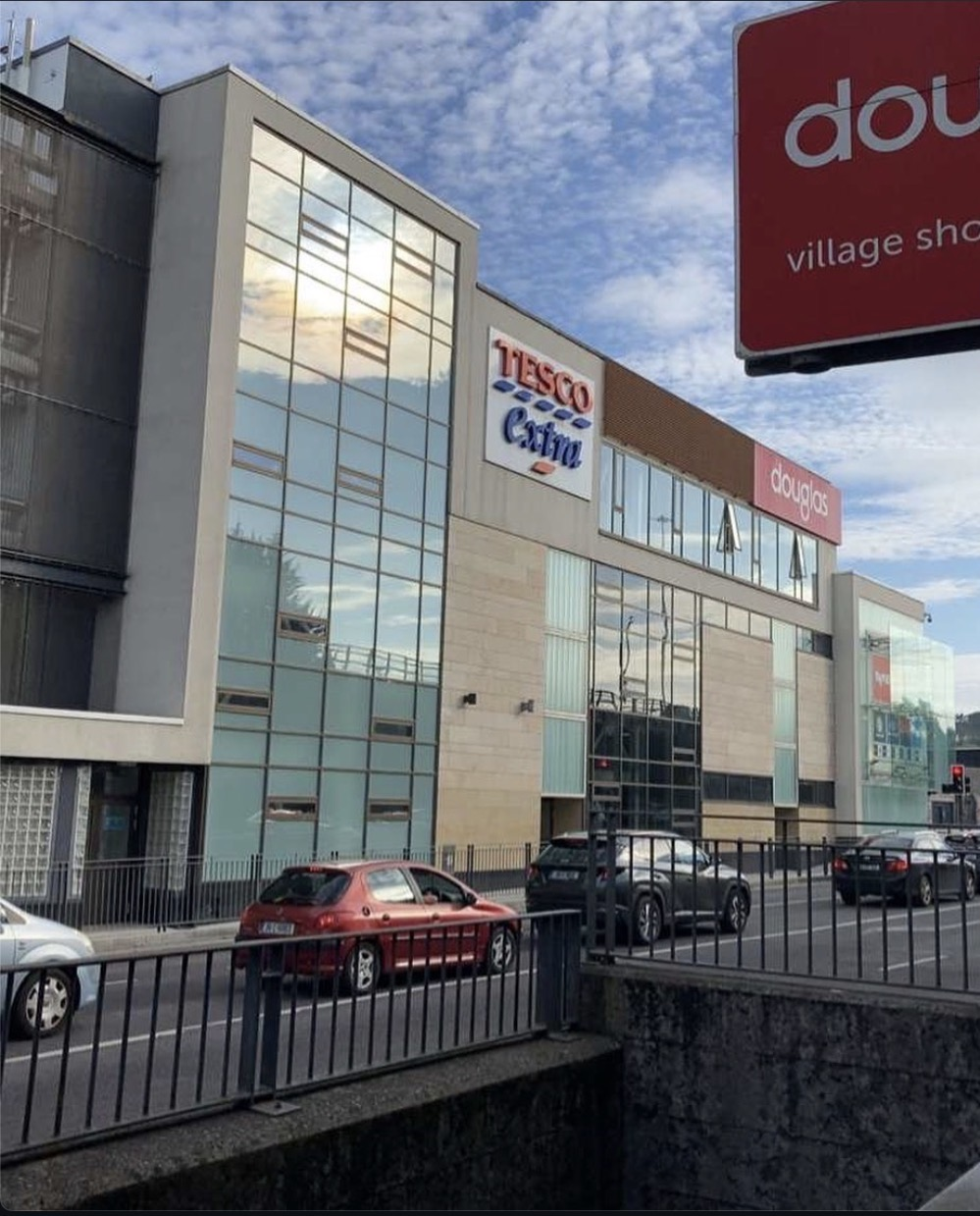
Signage at Douglas Village Shopping Centre

The village centre of Douglas has two principal commercial streets, East Douglas Street and West Douglas Street, which are situated approximately 300m apart. Retail activity is also centred around two shopping centres, Douglas Court Shopping Centre and Douglas Village Shopping Centre. "Douglas Court" (anchored by Dunnes Stores) was built in the early-1990s, and "Douglas Village" was originally developed in the mid-1970s and was the second shopping centre ever built in Ireland.

A farmers market is held every Saturday morning outside the Douglas Village Shopping Centre entrance.

== Demographics ==
In the 2011 census, the percentage of Irish nationals living in Douglas was 88.8%. UK nationals accounted for 1.7%; Polish nationals 3.2%; Lithuanians 0.6%; other EU nationals 2.1%; other nationals 2.9%; and 0.7% did not state their nationality.

In the 2016 census, 78.6% of residents of the Douglas electoral division identified as Catholic, 8% were members of other religions, 12% had no religion and less than 1% did not state a religion. In the same census, 86.2% of electoral division residents identified as white Irish, 8.3% were other whites, 1% were black, 1.7% Asian or Asian Irish, 1.4% were of other ethnicities, and 1% did not state an ethnicity.

== Climate ==
Douglas has an oceanic climate (Köppen: Cfb).

Climate data for Douglas
Month	Jan	Feb	Mar	Apr	May	Jun	Jul	Aug	Sep	Oct	Nov	Dec	Year
Mean daily maximum °C (°F)	8.2 (46.8)	8.6 (47.5)	9.7 (49.5)	11.8 (53.2)	14.4 (57.9)	16.9 (62.4)	18.3 (64.9)	18.1 (64.6)	16.5 (61.7)	13.5 (56.3)	10.3 (50.5)	8.6 (47.5)	12.9 (55.2)
Daily mean °C (°F)	5.9 (42.6)	6.1 (43.0)	6.8 (44.2)	8.5 (47.3)	11.2 (52.2)	13.8 (56.8)	15.2 (59.4)	15.0 (59.0)	13.5 (56.3)	10.9 (51.6)	8.0 (46.4)	6.5 (43.7)	10.1 (50.2)
Mean daily minimum °C (°F)	3.5 (38.3)	3.5 (38.3)	3.8 (38.8)	5.3 (41.5)	7.8 (46.0)	10.4 (50.7)	12.1 (53.8)	11.9 (53.4)	10.5 (50.9)	8.2 (46.8)	5.5 (41.9)	4.3 (39.7)	7.2 (45.0)
Average precipitation mm (inches)	72.9 (2.87)	65.7 (2.59)	66.0 (2.60)	65.9 (2.59)	71.6 (2.82)	69.3 (2.73)	74.0 (2.91)	70.1 (2.76)	65.6 (2.58)	97.6 (3.84)	79.8 (3.14)	86.6 (3.41)	885.1 (34.84)
Source: Weather.Directory

== Sport ==
=== GAA ===
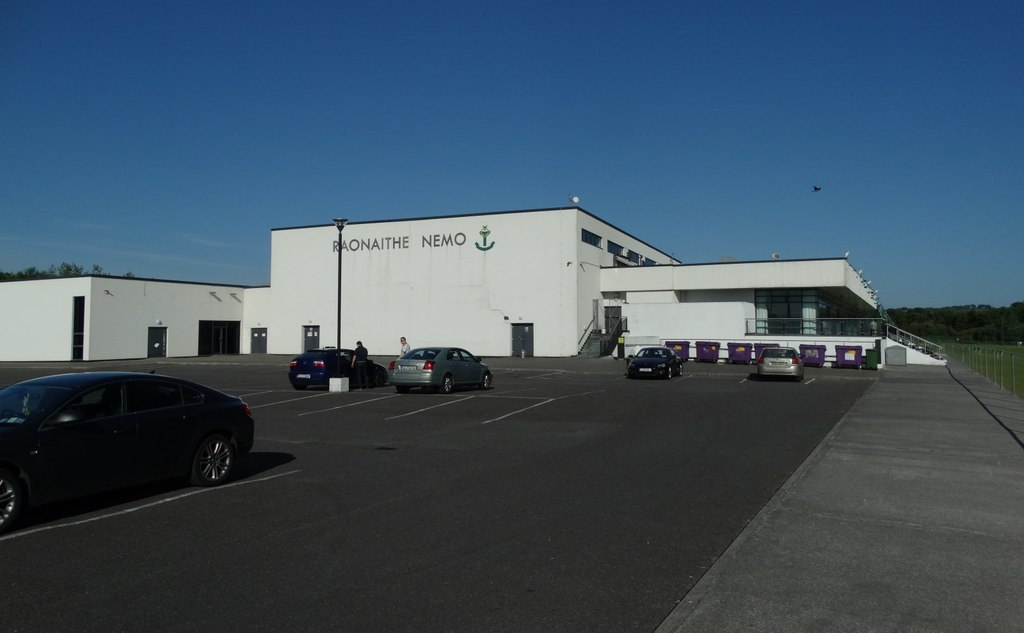
Nemo Rangers GAA club

GAA clubs in the area include the Douglas GAA and Nemo Rangers hurling and football clubs. Nemo Rangers were historically associated with neighbouring Turners Cross parish, but moved to a new location in the Trabeg area of Douglas in the 1990s.

In the 2004, 2007 and 2012 under-10 (u10) Community Games, Douglas won the Cork Community Games, the Munster Community Games and the all-Ireland Community Games.

=== Association football ===
Local soccer clubs include Tramore Athletic F.C., Grangevale AFC, College Corinthians and Douglas Hall AFC.

=== Golf ===
There are also local golf (and pitch and putt) clubs, including Douglas Golf Club, Garryduff Pitch and Putt Club and Douglas Pitch and Putt Club.

=== Rugby union ===
Douglas has representation in rugby union, and Douglas RFC was founded in 1902 as one of the earliest Cork rugby clubs. While this original club drew members from the workforce of St Patrick's Woollen Mills in Douglas (which closed in the 1970s), the club in its current form was founded in 1979.

=== Other sports ===
Other sports clubs include tennis (Douglas Tennis Club), basketball (Fr. Mathews Basketball Club), gymnastics (Douglas Gymnastics Club), martial arts (at Elite Fitness Centre), cricket and hockey clubs (Cork Harlequins and Church of Ireland Hockey Club).

== Transport ==
=== Road ===
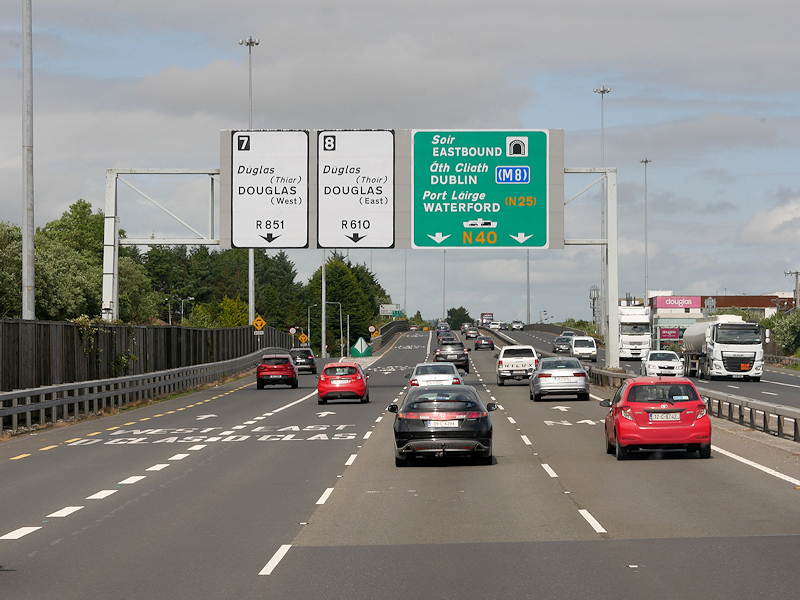
The N40 at the Douglas exits

The N40 passes through Douglas. It is not possible to join the N40 from Douglas to travel in an eastbound direction. Westbound traffic may not exit the N40 at Douglas, instead having to exit at Junction 9. Additional access is available via the N28 from nearby Rochestown.

Douglas is served by a number of R-standard roads, including the R609 (Carrigaline Road, which links to the N28), R610 (Passage West to the city centre via Rochestown Road and Douglas Road), the R851 (linking the city centre to the N27 via South Douglas Road and Grange Road), and the R853 (Well Road, which links to Ballinlough, Mahon and Blackrock).

=== Bus ===
Several Bus Éireann bus routes pass through Douglas. These include route 206 (Grange to South Mall via South Douglas Road), 207 (Donnybrook to Ballyvolane via Douglas Road), 216 (Monkstown to Cork University Hospital via Douglas Road and Maryborough Hill), 219 (Southern Orbital, Munster Technological University Bishopstown Campus to Mahon), 220 (Ovens to Carrigaline/Camden Fort) and 223 (South Mall to Haulbowline via Douglas Road and Rochestown Road).

=== Rail ===
The nearest active railway station is Kent Station in the city centre, approximately 4 km away. Until 1932, Douglas was served by the Blackpool-Douglas route of the Cork Electric Tramways and Lighting Company.

== Religious congregations ==
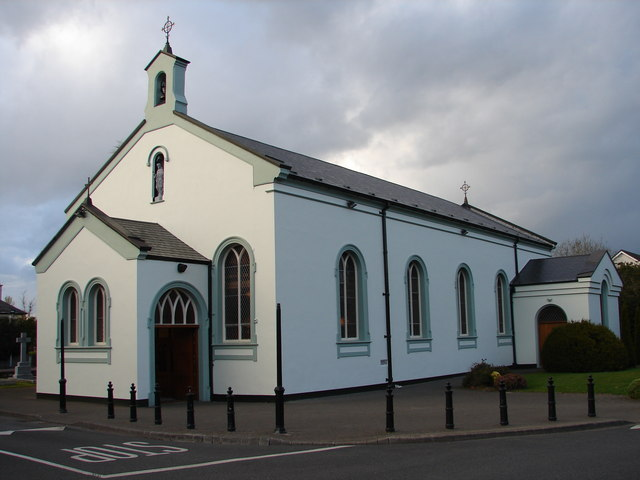
St Columbas Catholic church, Douglas

As of the 2016 census, 78.6% of the population of the Douglas electoral division identified as Catholic, with St Columbas as the first Catholic parish church in the area, dating to 1814. From the 1960s, with housing developments and population growth in Douglas, overcrowding in St Columbas prompted a decision to build a new Catholic church in the Grange/Frankfield area. This new church (the Church of the Incarnation) was consecrated in 1976, and was a chapel-of-ease to the Douglas parish before being separating into its own parish in 1982. St Patrick's Catholic church serves the Rochestown area, and dates to 1991.

Other religious congregations serving the Douglas population include St Luke's Church (Anglican) which was consecrated in 1875, the Wesley Chapel (Methodist) on the Douglas Road, Douglas Baptist congregation (which meets at Douglas Community School), Radical Life church (Pentecostal), the Holy Trinity church (Anglican) in Frankfield which dates to 1838, and the Inspiration House (RCCG) in Frankfield.

== Education ==
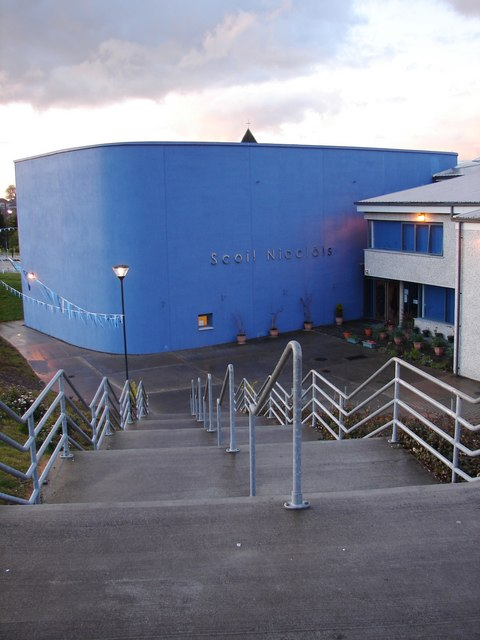
Scoil Nioclais in Frankfield

Primary schools serving the area include St Columba's GNS and St Columba's GNS (Catholic girls and boys national schools respectively), Scoil An Athair Tadhg Ó Murchú (a mixed-gender gaelscoil), St Luke's National School (a Church of Ireland mixed-gender school) and Scoil Nioclais (a mixed-gender Catholic primary school in Grange). Other nearby schools include Eglantine (a Catholic girls school in Ballinlough) and Rochestown Educate Together National School and Rochestown National School (both mixed-gender schools in Rochestown).

Douglas Community School (boys) and Regina Mundi College (girls) are secondary schools in Douglas.

== Notable residents ==
- John Bainbridge, first-class cricketer and Royal Navy rear-admiral
- John Dunlay, recipient of the Victoria Cross
- Jack Gleeson, film and stage actor
- Gerald Goldberg, first Jewish Lord Mayor of Cork
- Rob Heffernan, Irish Olympian
- Cillian Murphy, film and stage actor
- Billy O'Callaghan, short story writer and novelist
- Donncha O'Callaghan, former professional rugby union player
- Ronan O'Gara, former professional rugby player and coach
- Chiedozie Ogbene, football player from Grange
- Lennox Robinson, dramatist, poet and director of the Abbey Theatre
- Allie Sherlock, singer and guitarist

== See also ==
- List of towns and villages in Ireland
- Metropolitan Cork
