= Cork City Park railway station =

Railway station in County Cork, Ireland

Cork City Park

General information
- Location: Cork, County Cork; Ireland

History
- Original company: Cork, Blackrock and Passage Railway
- Pre-grouping: Cork, Blackrock and Passage Railway
- Post-grouping: Great Southern Railways

Key dates
- 1 June 1885: Station opens
- 1 September 1889: Station closes

Cork City Park railway station was on the Cork, Blackrock and Passage Railway in County Cork, Ireland.

== History ==
The station opened on 1 June 1885.

Passenger services were withdrawn on 1 September 1889.

== Routes ==
Preceding station	Disused railways	Following station
Terminus	Cork, Blackrock and Passage Railway; Cork-Crosshaven	Blackrock
