= Cinque Ports in Ireland =

In 1462, a charter granted to the Irish borough of Youghal in County Cork made it "one of the Petylymmes [i.e. petty limbs] of the Cinque Ports in Ireland" with all associated liberties and franchises. William Gordon Perrin assumed in 1922 that this referred to the English Cinque Ports, because in 1462 the Lordship of Ireland was subordinate to the Kingdom of England. On the other hand, George Bernard O'Connor stated in 1906 that the Queen's Cinque Ports of Ireland in the reign of Elizabeth I were the important seaports on the east coast of Ireland.

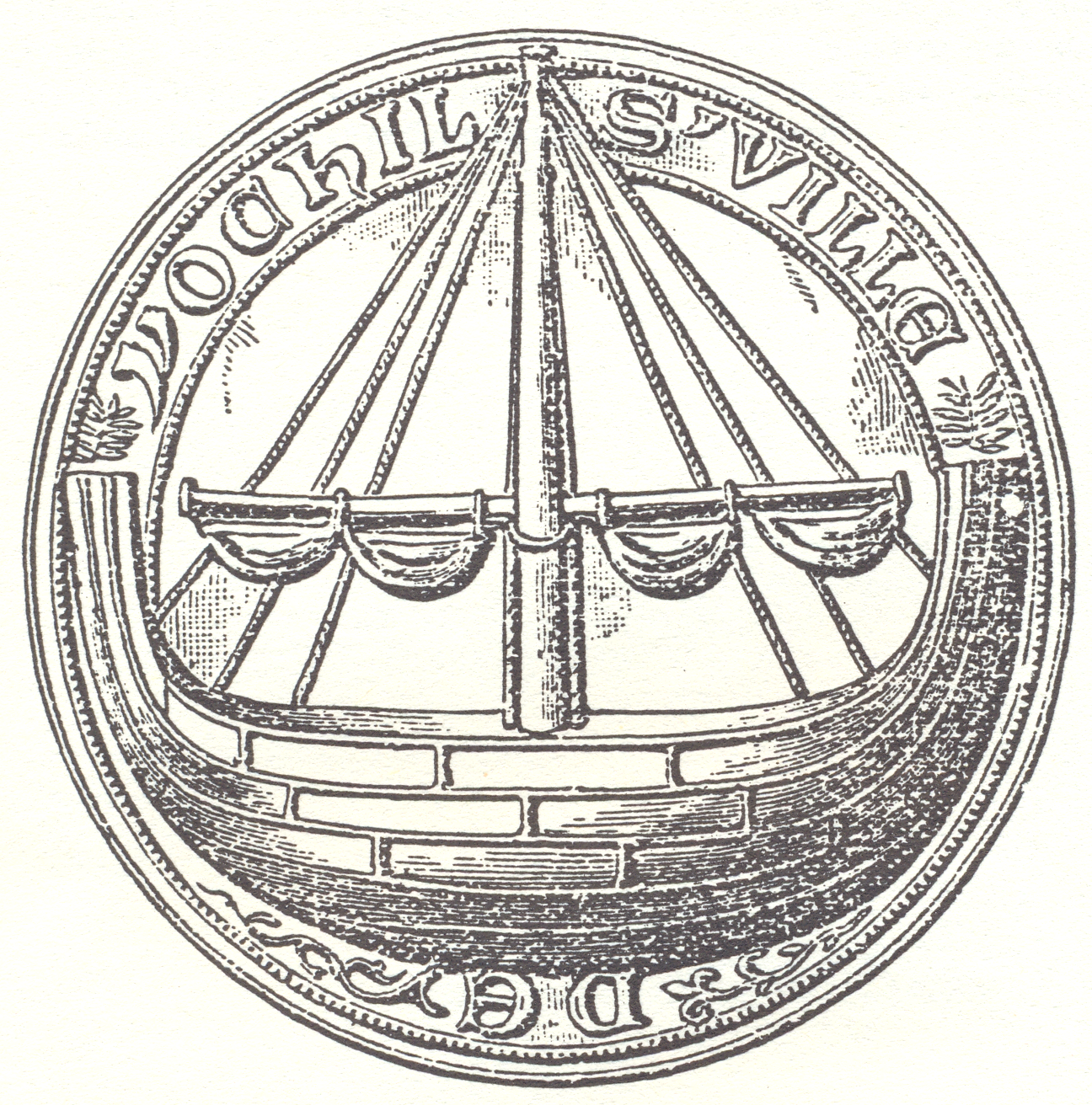
Municipal Seal of Youghal (1527 imprint)

Baronial seal of Hastings (early 14th century)

The medieval seal of the corporation of Youghal displayed a single-masted ship (cog), reflecting its importance as a port; while Helen Elrington suggests the seal specifically alludes to the town's Cinque-Port connection, Samuel Hayman dates the seal to Thomas de Clare in the 1270s.
