= Cork, Blackrock and Passage Railway =

Abandoned Railway in Cork, Ireland

Coordinates: 51.8973°N 8.4627°W

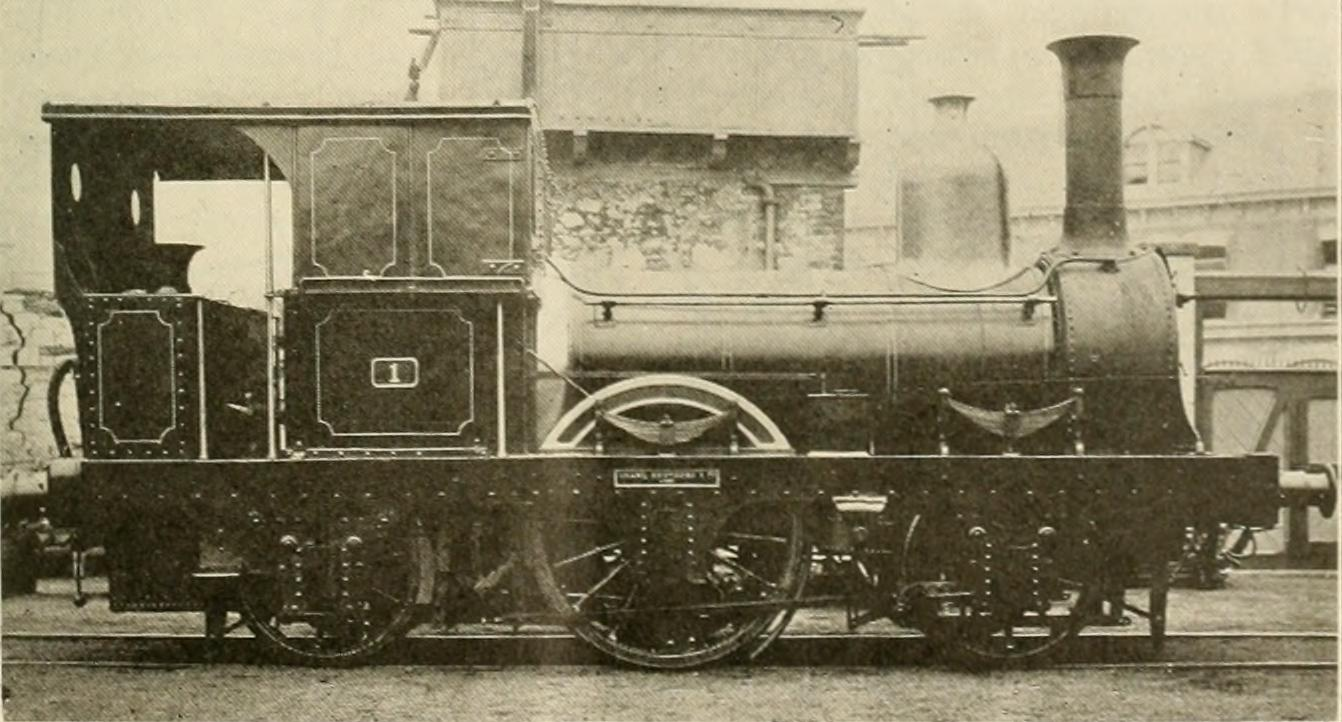

Overview
- Termini: Cork City; Crosshaven

History
- Opened: 18 June 1850
- Closed: 10 September 1932

Technical
- Line length: 16 miles (26 km) (1922)
- Track length: 20 miles 35 chains (32.9 km) (1922)
- Track gauge: 3 ft (914 mm)
- Old gauge: 5 ft 3 in (1,600 mm) Irish gauge

The Cork, Blackrock and Passage Railway (CB&PR) was a 3 ft (914 mm) narrow gauge railway in County Cork, Ireland. The line originally opened in 1850 as a 5 ft 3 in (1,600 mm) Irish standard gauge railway between Cork and Passage West and operated steam feeder ferries to other locations round Cork Harbour. The company was heavily dependent on summer tourist traffic for a considerable proportion of its revenue. The railway was converted to 3 ft (914 mm) narrow gauge in 1900 in conjunction with extensions southwards to Crosshaven which were completed in 1904. The railway closed in 1932 and has since been replaced by a public pathway and nature area.

== History ==
=== Background ===
Cork, Blackrock and Passage Railway Act 1846
- Act of Parliament
- Parliament of the United Kingdom
- Long title: An Act for making a Railway from the Borough of Cork through Blackrock to the Town of Passage West.
- Citation: 9 & 10 Vict. c. cxlviii

Dates
- Royal assent: 16 July 1846

Cork, Blackrock and Passage Railway, Extension to Monkstown and Amendment Act 1847
- Act of Parliament
- Parliament of the United Kingdom
- Long title: An Act to authorize an Extension of the Cork, Blackrock and Passage Railway to Monkstown, and to amend the Act relating thereto.
- Citation: 10 & 11 Vict. c. lix

Dates
- Royal assent: 25 June 1847

Text of statute as originally enacted

By the early 1830s century Cork City had become a prosperous port. Paddle steamers were operating out of Cork City to a number of locations in Cork Harbour including resorts such as Cove (later known as Queenstown and now Cobh). A line from Cork City to Passage was seen as a business opportunity that could exploit a shorter travel time to the steamboat destinations around Cork Harbour as well as providing important communications to the boatbuilding shipyard at Passage. Some also felt at that time there might be potential for exploiting Passage as a transatlantic port. Following a variety of earlier schemes the Cork, Blackrock and Passage Railway Act 1846 was passed on 16 July 1846 authorising construction of the railway to Passage.

=== Broad gauge operations ===
The initial, northern section of the line was 6 miles 49 chains (10.6 km) long and ran from the Cork terminus at City Park some 12 minutes walk from Patrick Bridge to the eastern terminus alongside the steamboat pier at Passage West. A trial run was completed in May 1850 and the railway opened on Saturday 10 June 1850 to large patronage for the opening weekend with trains packed to capacity and 6,000 passengers transported on the Sunday.

Three small Sharp Brothers 2-2-2WT steam locomotives operated the line. The passenger stock was about a dozen coaches comprising a mixture of first, second and third classes.

The CB&PR directors decided that with increasing patronage to Cove, now renamed Queenstown, they wished to operate their own steamship to connect with trains. As the CB&PR did not have power to operate boats a private company was formed and a vessel, the 'PS Queen, was chartered from the River Steamboat Company. A price war subsequently ensured with other ferry operators however the enterprise expanded and by 1855 was operating four paddle steamers of between 56 and 11 tons.

After the Cork and Youghal Railway opened its branch to Queenstown on 10 March 1862 the competition from the direct route forced the CB&PR to reduce its combined rail/steam fares.

The Cork Terminus was relocated to Albert Park in 1873, nearer the city centre and closer to the Albert Quay station of the Cork, Bandon and South Coast Railway, the move being subsidised as the City Quay site was needed for development of the docks.

Cork, Blackrock and Passage Railway (Steam Vessels) Act 1881
- Act of Parliament
- Parliament of the United Kingdom
- Long title: An Act for empowering the Cork, Blackrock, and Passage Railway Company to provide and use Steam and other Vessels; and for other purposes.
- Citation: 44 & 45 Vict. c. cxxv

Dates
- Royal assent: 18 July 1881

Text of statute as originally enacted

The Cork, Blackrock and Passage Railway (Steam Vessels) Act 1881 (44 & 45 Vict. c. cxxv) authorised the CB&PR to operate steamboats, and those from the subsidiary company were taken into direct ownership. The steamers were expensive to operate but provided essentially feeder traffic to the railway. The rival Citizen River Steamer Company was unable to meet liabilities in January 1890 and was wound up, the CB&PR acquiring the vessels for £1405 2s. 3d. and thereby eliminating that source of competition.

The CB&PR remained relatively profitable compared to most railways in the 1880s, though there began to be decrease in passengers, arrested by switching steam services to a one penny pier to pier rate. The company was late to introduce a one-zone fare system in 1891.

=== Extension and narrow gauge conversion ===
Cork, Blackrock and Passage Railway Act 1896
- Act of Parliament
- Parliament of the United Kingdom
- Long title: An Act to authorise the Cork Blackrock and Passage Railway Company to extend their Railway to Crosshaven and to confer further powers on the Company in relation to their undertaking and for other purposes.
- Citation: 59 & 60 Vict. c. cxcvii

Dates
- Royal assent: 7 August 1896

Text of statute as originally enacted

Cork Blackrock and Passage Railway Act 1901
- Act of Parliament
- Parliament of the United Kingdom
- Long title: An Act to enable the Cork Blackrock and Passage Railway Company to raise additional money to confer further powers on them in relation to their undertaking and for other purposes.
- Citation: 1 Edw. 7. c. ccxl

Dates
- Royal assent: 9 August 1901

The latter part of the 19th century had seen considerations given to extending the CB&PR to eliminate some steamship journeys and with the aim of creating greater residential development and commuter traffic. By the Cork, Blackrock and Passage Railway Act 1896 (59 & 60 Vict. c. cxcvii) of 7 August 1896 the CB&PR obtained permission for a 9-mile-64-chain (15.8 km) extension from Passage to Crosshaven. It was calculated building the extension as narrow gauge would save money, and it was decided to convert the original railway to narrow gauge at the same time. An opportunity was lost in not using the provisions of the earlier Light Railway Acts which would have been cheaper. In the event construction difficulties and time overruns occurred particularly with the 1,500 feet (460 m) tunnel just north of Passage, the final cost being accounted as £200,093.

While extension was under construction the CB&PR's own staff converted the existing line to Passage by laying a third rail, the line closing on 29 October 1900 for the switch from broad to narrow gauge. The section between Cork and Blackrock was also converted to double track at the same time, unique on an Irish narrow gauge railway. The southern extension from Passage West to Monkstown opened on 1 August 1902 with Carrigaline being open from 3 June 1903. The final section to Crosshaven opened on 1 June 1904 including a viaduct over the River Owenabue and a four-span 300 feet (91 m) lattice bridge at Crosshaven.

Rolling stock for the line consisted of four new narrow gauge locomotives by Neilson Reid in Glasgow and a number of bogie coaches. For the first time the CB&PR showed an interest in freight with a number of open wagons, vans and cattle trucks being purchased also.

The building of the extension occurred concurrently with serious competition from the Cork Electric Tramways and Lighting Company line operating to Ballintemple and then Blackrock having a negative effect on the commuter traffic in that area.

The CB&PR achieved a net profit of £8,859 on receipts of £23,341 in 1904–5, with summer tourist traffic being very significant though the overall financial position remained strained by loans and Debenture Stock. Despite losses from steamer services – which were nonetheless useful for feeder services – the CB&PR's operation was financially manageable through to the start of World War I in 1914.

=== War and civil unrest ===
The outbreak of World War I had an almost immediate impact on the CB&PR. Crosshaven station was closed to civilians on security grounds (Note: Outer Cork Harbour was significant militarily with bases on Haulbowline and Spike Islands.) and non-essential travel was stopped impacting the CB&PR's tourist traffic. Additional strains were placed by demands on the CB&PR's steamers to transport significant amounts of cargo for the military. Unlike in Britain the railways were not brought under government control during the war until 1917 and it was only then that retrospective compensation was received for losses.

The railway suffered extensive damage during the Irish Civil War of 1922–1923. The workshops at Passage were damaged. The viaduct at Douglas was partly destroyed and was initially replaced by a wooden structure built by the Railway Repair and Maintenance Corps of the newly formed Irish Army. The CB&PR was financially crippled by the various disruptions and with many other railways similarly financially distressed and the new independent government of the Irish Free State determined to amalgamate all its railways into a single organisation named Great Southern Railways.

=== Final years ===
In 1924, the company was incorporated into the Great Southern Railway. Economy measures saw the double track section of the railway singled in 1927 and the steamer fleet was also disposed of by this point. Competition from motor buses and lorries became intense and the former were ultimately responsible for the closure of the railway. (Note: Cork tramways were also affected, closing in 1931)

The section between Monkstown and Crosshaven closed on 31 May 1932, with the remainder of the railway closing on 10 September 1932. After closure the line's steam locomotives were transferred to the Cavan and Leitrim Railway after refurbishment at either Rockferry, Cork or Inchicore Dublin Workshops.

== Route ==
The railway operated along the west bank of the River Lee and Cork Harbour from Cork City Centre to Blackrock and Passage West. Thereafter the 1904 extension headed inland towards Carrigaline before running alongside the south bank of the Owenabue River to Crosshaven.

Stations were :

- Cork Albert Street railway station (replaced the earlier Cork Victoria Road railway station)
- Show Ground Halt railway station
- Blackrock (CBPR) railway station
- Rochestown railway station
- Passage railway station
- Glenbrook (CBPR) railway station
- Monkstown railway station
- Rafeen railway station
- Carrigaline railway station
- Crosshaven railway station

== Connections to other railways ==
The CB&PR had no connections to any other railway system, but had a short connection to the goods yard of the Cork and Bandon Railway for a short time.

== Rolling stock ==
CB&PR Locomotives
No.	Introduced	Type	Builder	Maker No.	Gauge	GSR No.	Withdrawn	Notes
1	1850	2-2-2WT	Sharp Brothers	655	5' 3"		1900	
2	1850	2-2-2WT	Sharp Brothers	656	5' 3"		1900	Rebuilt as 2-2-2ST
3	1850	2-2-2WT	Sharp Brothers	662	5' 3"		1900	
4	1900	2-4-2T	Neilson	5561	3' 0"	4p 10L	1959	
5	1900	2-4-2T	Neilson	5562	3' 0"	5p 11L	1936	
6	1900	2-4-2T	Neilson	5563	3' 0"	6p 12L	1959	
7	1900	2-4-2T	Neilson	5564	3' 0"	7p 13L	1954	

== Greenway replacement ==
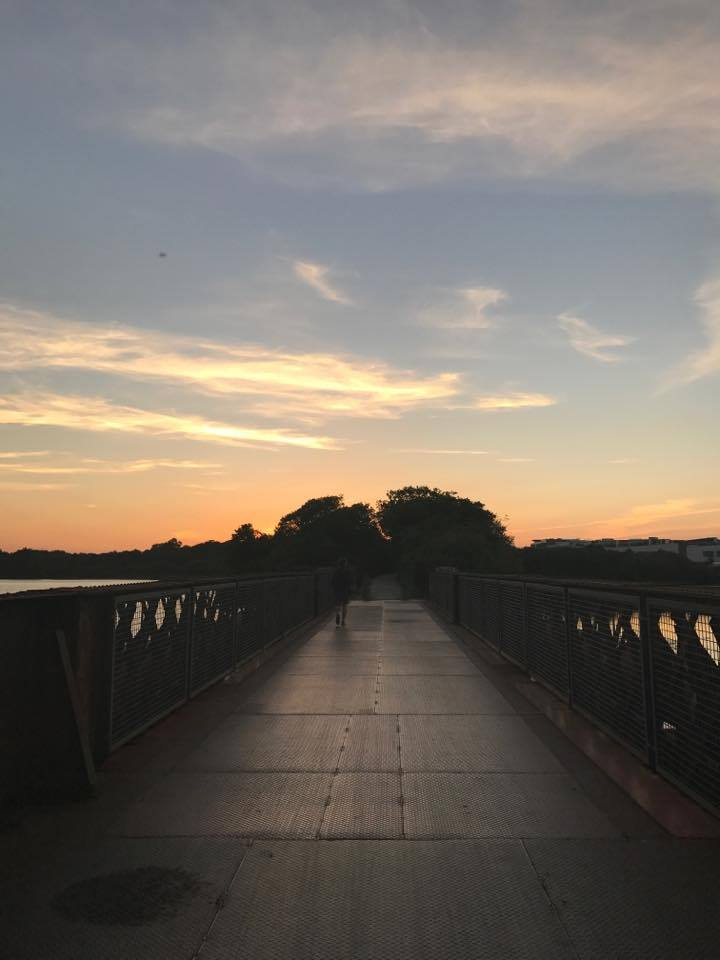
Pedestrian bridge (known as the "black bridge") at the Rochestown end of the path

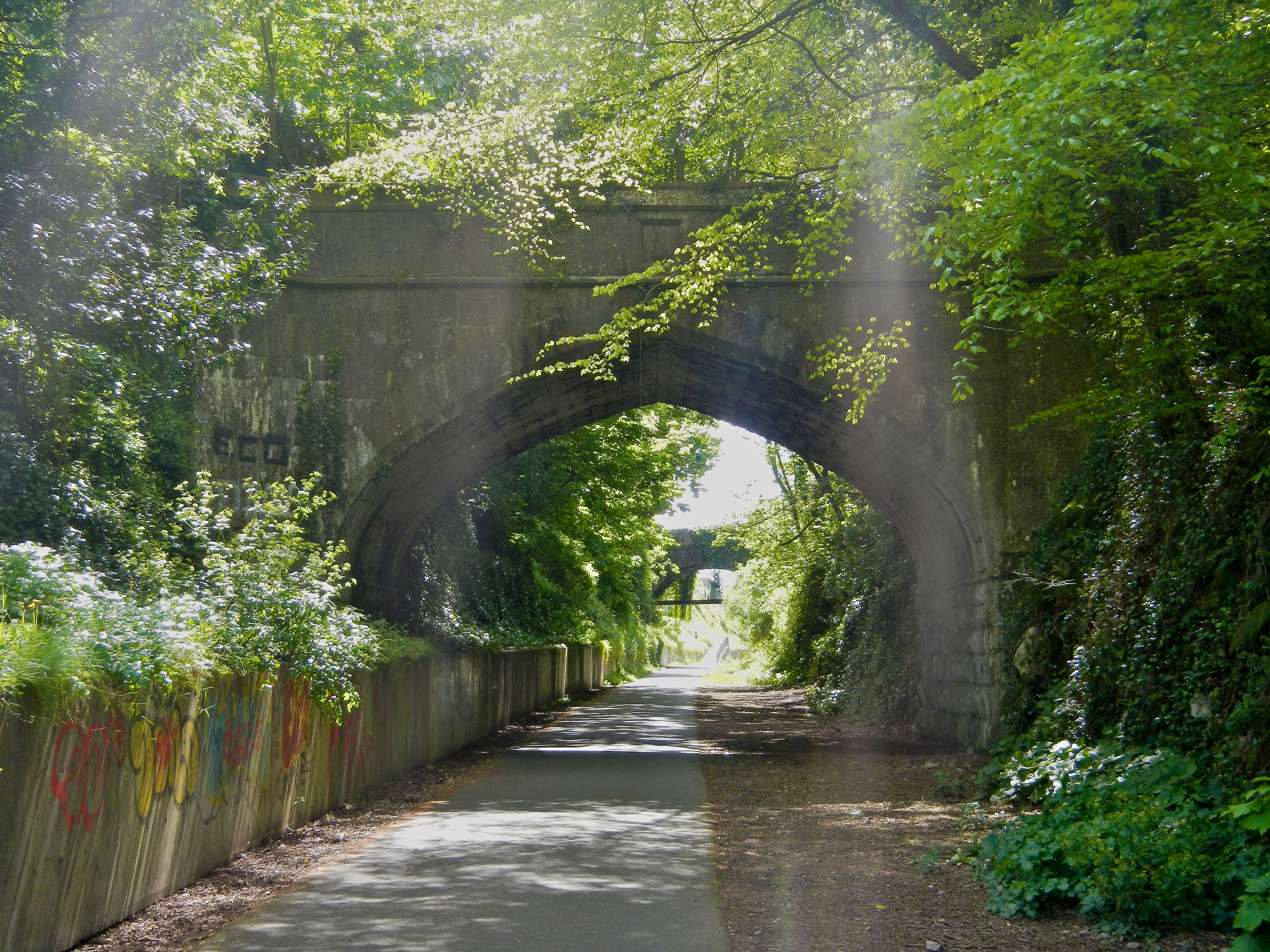
The path in 2012

Since the closing of the railway, the line has been paved over to serve as a recreational walkway, with lighting and benches put in place. Two bridges were put in place along the Rochestown area of the path for pedestrians. The Albert Road station building has survived. It was, for many years, occupied by Metal Products Ltd. who operated a factory producing nuts, bolts and other metal components. It was later occupied by Carey's tool hire company. The section of former rail between Albert Road and the Atlantic pond has been mostly removed. From the Atlantic Pond to Rochestown a paved footpath follows the route of the rail line. The rest of the walkway to Passage consists of a gravel walkway that follows the river. There is evidence of the rail line between Passage and Monkstown, then onto Carrigaline. From the eastern edge of Carrigaline town the walkway continues to the outskirts of Crosshaven.

Other remains of the original rail line are visible at Blackrock – where the signal house and platform are still intact. The bridge over the Douglas estuary, between Blackrock and Rochestown is still standing, although it had fallen into disrepair until the late 1990s when extensive repair work was completed. The remains of the Rochestown platform can be seen from the Rochestown road. At various points on the route from Passage to Monkstown and Carrigaline, smaller bridges, old water towers and tunnels are visible. Along the length of walkway from Carrigaline, signal lights for the trains have been restored and line the Owenabue River to Crosshaven.

Work began in May 2017 to improve the path that connected to the Marina Park, as well as the park itself. From the pedestrian bridge over the South Ring Road just past the Rochestown area to the park, construction has taken place to improve the surface of the path, maintain the trees along the path, and install new walkways down from footpaths above.

A Passage Railway Greenway Improvement Scheme commenced in 2021 to improve part of the route for pedestrians and cyclists.

== See also ==
- Cork and Muskerry Light Railway
- List of narrow-gauge railways in Ireland
- Schull and Skibbereen Railway
- Cork Greenway
