= Rory Parata =

Australian-born Irish rugby union player

- Born: 14 August 1994 (age 32) Sydney, Australia
- Height: 1.83 m (6 ft 0 in)
- Weight: 97 kg (15 st 4 lb)
- School: St Peter's Community School; Rockwell College
- University: IT Carlow

Rugby union career
- Position: Centre
- Current team: Zebre
Amateur team(s)
Years	Team	Apps	(Points)
- Dolphin
- Sundays Well
2013–2017	Galwegians		
2017	Harbour Dunedin		
Senior career
Years	Team	Apps	(Points)
2015−2017	Connacht	29	(25)
2016	→Connacht Eagles	2	(0)
2018	Zebre	5	(0)
2018−	Cornish Pirates		
- Correct as of 5 January 2018
International career
Years	Team	Apps	(Points)
2013	Ireland U19	2	
- Correct as of 7 April 2013

Rory Parata (born 14 August 1994) is an Australian-born Irish professional rugby union player. He primarily plays as a centre. As of 2021, Parata plays for English side Cornish Pirates in the RFU Championship. He previously played for Irish provincial side Connacht, having come through the team's academy, and Zebre.

== Early life ==
Parata was born in Sydney, Australia to a father from New Zealand and a mother from Ireland. His family moved to his mother's native County Cork when he was nine years old. Parata played rugby league from a young age in Australia, but after his family moved to Ireland he found he disliked the non-contact rugby union played at under-age with Dolphin. He instead played Gaelic football with Passage West and soccer instead, before returning to rugby at a later age. After returning to rugby Parata played with another Cork city-based club, this time Sundays Well.

Parata attended St Peter's Community School in Passage West and Rockwell College in Cashel. He played for Rockwell in the Munster Schools Senior Cup and was part of the starting team beaten in the final by Crescent College in the final in 2013.

== Club career ==
=== Connacht ===
Parata played for the Munster under-18 clubs team, but moved to Irish rivals Connacht at under-19 level. He joined the Connacht academy ahead of the 2013–14 season. With the move to the west of Ireland, Parata also joined All-Ireland League team Galwegians. While he was playing with Galwegians, the club won successive promotions, ending up in Division 1A.

Parata's first senior appearance for Connacht came in a preseason friendly against Wasps in August 2013. He did not feature for the senior team in his first two years in the academy, but featured for the second tier side, the Connacht Eagles, in the British and Irish Cup. In the 2013–14 competition, Parata started three games, was named on the bench for two and didn't feature in the other. In the following season he played in two of the British and Irish Cup games, one of these appearances coming as a start, and also played for the Eagles in a friendly with the Germany national team in January 2015.

In the 2015–16 preseason, Parata made his first start for Connacht, featuring against Grenoble, Castres and Munster in friendly matches. With first choice centre Robbie Henshaw away at the 2015 Rugby World Cup, Parata made his competitive debut for Connacht in the opening game of the 2015–16 Pro12, starting against the Newport Gwent Dragons on 4 September 2015. He made his first European appearance just over two months later, when he featured in Connacht's opening 2015–16 Challenge Cup fixture. Parata scored a try in the game away to Russian side Enisei-STM, which took place in the team's Siberian base of Krasnoyarsk. During the course of the season, he played a total of 12 Pro12 games and six in the Challenge Cup.

It was announced in December 2016 that Parata had signed a senior contract with Connacht, becoming a full member of the province's first team squad in the 2016–17 season. He played fewer games in that season, making five appearances in the 2016–17 Pro12 and three in the Champions Cup. In April 2017, it was announced that Parata would leave the province at the end of the season.

=== Harbour Dunedin ===
After leaving Connacht, Parata travelled to his father's native New Zealand. He was one of a number of released Connacht players to make the journey, along with Ciarán Gaffney, Cian Romaine and Jack Dineen. In New Zealand Parata joined Harbour, an amateur team in the Dunedin Premier. While he was playing with them, the side reached the final of the competition, where they were beaten 24–15 by Southern.

=== Zebre ===
In January 2018, it was announced that Parata would return to the Pro14, having signed for Italian side Zebre for the remainder of the season. The move saw him link up with former Connacht head coach Michael Bradley and his former Connacht teammate Ciarán Gaffney.

== International career ==
Parata has represented Ireland at under-age level, though he is also qualified to play for Australia by birth and New Zealand through his father. In 2013 he was selected for the Irish under-19 squad in games against England and France. In the first game he featured as a replacement, before starting at out-half against France the following week.
