= Show Ground Halt railway station =

Former railway station in County Cork, Ireland

Show Ground Halt

General information
- Location: Cork, County Cork; Ireland
- Coordinates: 51.8986°N 8.4398°W

History
- Original company: Cork, Blackrock and Passage Railway
- Pre-grouping: Cork, Blackrock and Passage Railway
- Post-grouping: Great Southern Railways

Key dates
- 1880: Station opens
- 12 September 1932: Station closes
Location

Show Ground Halt railway station was on the Cork, Blackrock and Passage Railway in County Cork, Ireland.

== History ==
The station opened in 1880. It was closed in August 1932.

== Routes ==
Preceding station	Disused railways	Following station
Cork Albert Street	Cork, Blackrock and Passage Railway; Cork-Crosshaven	Blackrock
