= Monkstown railway station (County Cork) =

Railway station in Ireland

Monkstown

General information
- Location: Cork, County Cork; Ireland
- Coordinates: 51.8495°N 8.3315°W

History
- Original company: Cork, Blackrock and Passage Railway
- Pre-grouping: Cork, Blackrock and Passage Railway
- Post-grouping: Great Southern Railways

Key dates
- 1 August 1902: Station opens
- 12 September 1932: Station closes
Location

Monkstown railway station was on the Cork, Blackrock and Passage Railway in County Cork, Ireland.

== History ==
The station opened on 1 August 1902.

Passenger services were withdrawn on 12 September 1932.

== Routes ==
Preceding station	Disused railways	Following station
Glenbrook	Cork, Blackrock and Passage Railway; Cork-Crosshaven	Rafeen
