= St Peter's Community School, Cork =

St. Peter's Community School

Location
- Passage West, Cork, Ireland
- Coordinates: 51.8658°N 8.3403°W

Information
- Established: 1988
- Principal: Tony McSweeney
- Enrollment: approx. 360 (2020)
- Colours: Red and black
- Slogan: Quasi Liberi
- Website: https://www.stpeters.ie

St. Peter's Community School is a mixed-sex second level community school in Passage West, a commuter town of Cork, Ireland. It officially opened in 1988.

As of 2020, there were approximately 360 pupils enrolled in the school. Past pupils include rugby player Rory Parata, and politician Michael McGrath.
