= St Mary's Church, Carrigaline =

Anglican church in Cork, Ireland

Coordinates: 51°48′56″N 8°22′31″W

St Mary's Church
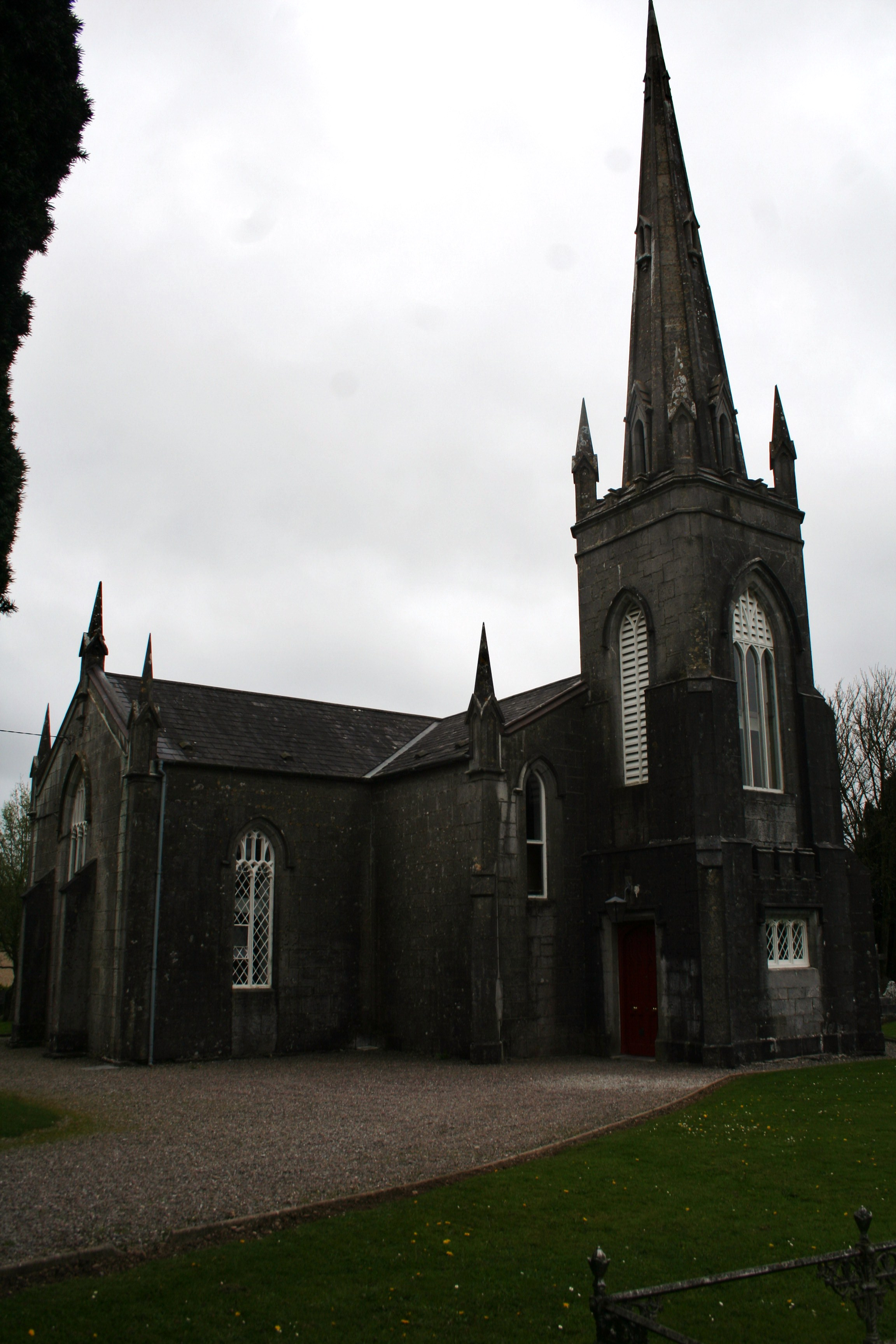
- Country: Ireland
- Denomination: Church of Ireland

Architecture
- Architect(s): James and George Richard Pain

St Mary's Church is a Gothic Revival Church of Ireland (Anglican) church near Carrigaline, County Cork, Ireland. It was completed in 1824, and dedicated to Mary, the mother of Jesus. It is in the Diocese of Cork, Cloyne, and Ross.

== History ==
St Mary's Church was built on the site of an earlier church dating from 1723. It was built to designs of the brothers, George Richard, and James Pain between 1823 and 1824, with a transept added in 1835 by William Hill, of Cork, then the diocesan architect. In 1893 the pews were replaced by William Henry Hill, who also panelled the chancel and added a window to the wall of the southern nave.

== Architecture ==
The church is built in the Gothic Revival style, and contains an octagonal limestone font dating from 1637. Among the tombs in the churchyard are two mausoleums (relating to the Morgan family of Kilnagleary, and Newenham family of Coolmore).
