= Rochestown railway station =

Railway station in Ireland

Rochestown
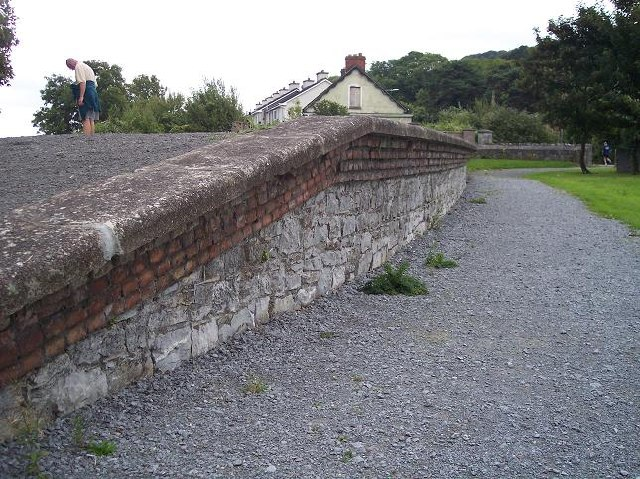
- Remains of Rochestown railway station. Photograph taken on 13 September 2005

General information
- Location: Rochestown and Douglas, Cork, County Cork; Ireland
- Coordinates: 51.877389°N 8.391683°W

History
- Original company: Cork, Blackrock and Passage Railway
- Pre-grouping: Cork, Blackrock and Passage Railway
- Post-grouping: Great Southern Railways

Key dates
- 8 June 1850: Station opens as Douglas
- 1 April 1856: Station renamed Rochestown
Location

Rochestown railway station was on the Cork, Blackrock and Passage Railway in Rochestown, County Cork, Ireland.

== History ==
The station opened as Douglas on 8 June 1850. On 1 April 1856 it was renamed Rochestown.

Passenger services were withdrawn on 12 September 1932.

== Routes ==
Preceding station	Disused railways	Following station
Blackrock	Cork, Blackrock and Passage Railway; Cork-Crosshaven	Passage
