= Rafeen railway station =

Railway station in Ireland

Rafeen

General information
- Location: Rafeen (Liscleary); County Cork; Ireland
- Coordinates: 51.8379°N 8.3611°W

History
- Original company: Cork, Blackrock and Passage Railway
- Pre-grouping: Cork, Blackrock and Passage Railway
- Post-grouping: Great Southern Railways

Key dates
- 16 June 1903: Station opens
- 12 September 1932: Station closes
Location

Rafeen railway station was on the Cork, Blackrock and Passage Railway in County Cork, Ireland.

== History ==
The station opened on 16 June 1903.

Passenger services were withdrawn on 12 September 1932.

== Routes ==
Preceding station	Disused railways	Following station
Monkstown	Cork, Blackrock and Passage Railway; Cork-Crosshaven	Carrigaline
