= Richard Caulfield =

Richard Caulfield (1823–1887) was secretary, librarian and custodian of the Royal Cork Institution and librarian for Queen's College, Cork.

== Life ==
Caulfield was born in Cork on 23 April 1823, a grandson of Henry Gosnell, physician at the Lying-In Hospital and first resident surgeon at the Cork North Infirmary. One of six children born to Catherine Gosnell and William Caulfield, he was named Richard, a family name.

Caulfield was educated under Dr. Browne at Bandon endowed school, and was admitted a pensioner at Trinity College, Dublin, in 1841. There he was influenced by the lectures on ancient philosophy of William Archer Butler. He graduated B.A. in 1845, LL.B. in 1864, and LL.D. in 1866.

The Society of Antiquaries elected Caulfield a fellow on 13 February 1862, and he became librarian of the Royal Cork Institution in 1864. He was appointed in 1876 librarian of Queen's College, Cork, and in 1882 was made an honorary member of the Royal Academy of History at Madrid. He was also a member of the Society of Antiquaries of Normandy, and a member of the committee for rebuilding Cork cathedral.

== Death and memorials ==
Caulfield died aged 64 on 3 February 1887 at his residence, the Royal Cork Institution, after a severe attack of bronchitis. He was respected across the sectarian divide. On 4 February, The Protestant Cork Constitution published a short unsigned appreciation which said of him that on more than one occasion he was chosen as arbiter in important historical and theological controversies. The funeral took place on 7 February 1887, when he was buried in the cemetery of St Luke's Church, Douglas. His grave is beside that of his friend, antiquarian colleague and historian of Youghal, the Rev. Samuel Hayman. The Catholic Cork Examiner reported that among those present were the Rev. J. D. Burke, Superior of the Congregation of Christian Brothers, Rev. S. O. Madden, Dean of Saint Finbarre's Cathedral, city dignitaries, and lecturers, students and professors from the Queen's College, including the President, William K. Sullivan.

In Caulfield's memory, a bronze door was erected at Saint Finbarre's Cathedral.

== Works ==
In 1853 Caulfield published Sigilla Ecclesiæ Hibernicæ Illustrata. In 1857 he edited for the Camden Society the Diary of Rowland Davies, D.D., Dean of Cork, 1689–90; and in 1859 he published Rotulus Pipæ Clonensis, the Pipe Roll of Cloyne. In 1860 he discovered at Dunmanway House, Co. Cork, the original manuscript of the autobiographical memoir of Sir Richard Cox, extending from 1702 to 1707; it had been used by Walter Harris in his edition of James Ware's Writers of Ireland, and Caulfield published the fragment.

While at Oxford in 1862 Caulfield discovered in the Bodleian Library the manuscript Life of St. Fin Barre, which he copied and published in 1864. In 1876 appeared his edition of the Council Book of the Corporation of Cork, followed in 1877 by The Register of the Parish of Christ Church, Cork. Next year appeared the Council Book of the Corporation of Youghal, with annals and appendices, and then the Council Book of the Corporation of Kinsale, 1652-1800. He was also author of Annals of St. Fin Barre's Cathedral, Cork, 1871, and Annals of the Cathedral of St. Colman, Cloyne. He contributed to antiquarian periodicals including Notes and Queries.

== Bibliography ==
- Caulfield, Richard, ed. (1853). Sigilla ecclesiæ Hibernicæ illustrata. The episcopal and capitular seals of the Irish cathedral churches illustrated. Pt. I-IV (in Latin). Dublin: J. M'Glashan.
- Caulfield, Richard, ed. (1859). Rotulus pipae Clonensis ex originali in registro ecclesiae cathedralis Clonensis asservato (in Latin). Cork: George Nash.
- Cox, Sir Richard (1860). Caulfield, Richard (ed.). Autobiography of the Rt Hon Sir Richard Cox, Baronet, Lord Chancellor of Ireland; from the original manuscript, preserved at the "Manor House, Dunmanway", county Cork. London: J.R. Smith.
- Caulfield, Richard, ed. (1864). A lecture on the history of the bishops of Cork, and Cathedral of St. Fin Barre. Cork: Purcell.
- Caulfield, Richard, ed. (1864). The life of Saint Fin Barre (in English and Latin). London: Russell Smith.
- Caulfield, Richard, ed. (1871). Annals of St. Fin Barre's Cathedral, Cork. Cork: Purcell.
- Caulfield, Richard, ed. (1876). The council book of the Corporation of the city of Cork, from 1609 to 1643, and from 1690 to 1800. Guildford, Surrey: J. Billing.
- Caulfield, Richard, ed. (1878). The council book of the Corporation of Youghal, from 1610 to 1659, from 1666 to 1687, and from 1690 to 1800. Guildford, Surrey: J. Billings.
- Caulfield, Richard (1879). The Council Book of the Corporation of Kinsale, from 1652 to 1800. Guildford, Surrey: J. Billing.
- Smith, Charles; Croker, Thomas Crofton; Caulfield, Richard (1893–1894). Robert; Day (eds.). The ancient and present state of the county and city of Cork. Vol. 2 vols (reprinted by the Cork Historical and Archæological Society, with the addition of numerous original notes, etc., from the mss. of the late Thomas Crofton Croker, F.S.A., and Richard Caulfield, LL.D. ed.). Cork: Guy & Co.
