= Blackrock railway station (County Cork) =

Railway station in Ireland

Blackrock
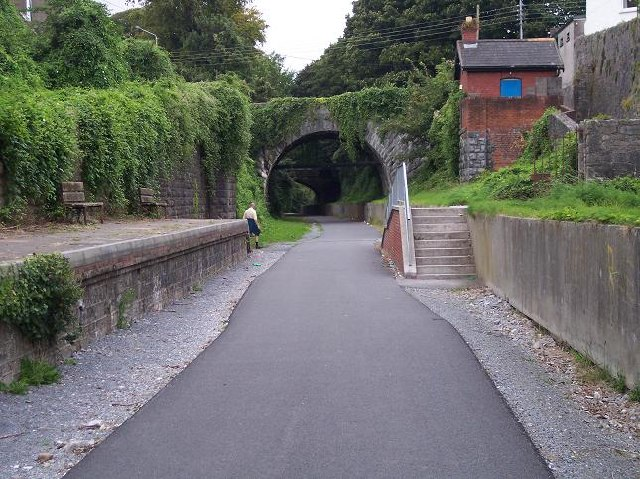
- Former station at Blackrock, photographed on 13 September 2005

General information
- Location: Blackrock, Cork, County Cork; Ireland
- Coordinates: 51.896166°N 8.419447°W

History
- Original company: Cork, Blackrock and Passage Railway
- Pre-grouping: Cork, Blackrock and Passage Railway
- Post-grouping: Great Southern Railways

Key dates
- 8 June 1850: Station opens
- 12 September 1932: Station closes
Location

Blackrock railway station was on the Cork, Blackrock and Passage Railway in County Cork, Ireland.

== History ==
The station opened on 8 June 1850.

Passenger services were withdrawn on 12 September 1932.

== Routes ==
Preceding station	Disused railways	Following station
Cork Victoria Road	Cork, Blackrock and Passage Railway; Cork-Crosshaven 1850-1873	Rochestown
Cork City Park	Cork, Blackrock and Passage Railway; Cork-Crosshaven 1885-1889	Rochestown
Show Ground Halt	Cork, Blackrock and Passage Railway; Cork-Crosshaven 1873-1932	Rochestown
