= Cork Albert Street railway station =

Former railway station in Cork, Ireland

Cork Albert Street
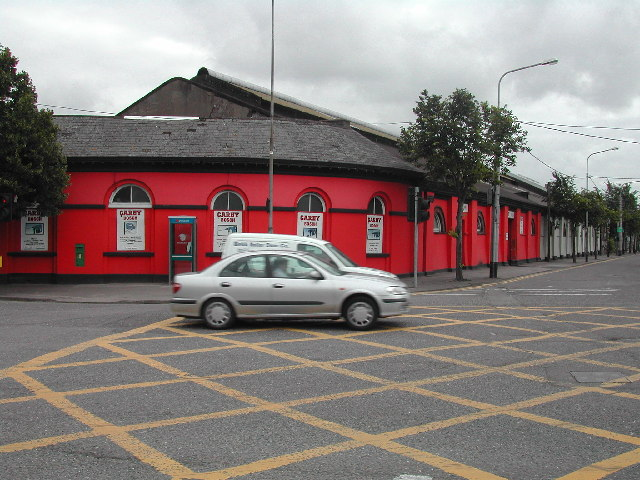
- Former Albert Street station, Cork. The railway closed in 1932 but the Albert Street terminus still stands and is used by a firm of builders merchants. Photographed on 22 July 2003.

General information
- Location: Cork, County Cork; Ireland
- Coordinates: 51.8973°N 8.4627°W

History
- Original company: Cork, Blackrock and Passage Railway
- Pre-grouping: Cork, Blackrock and Passage Railway
- Post-grouping: Great Southern Railways

Key dates
- 6 February 1873: Station opens
- 12 September 1932: Station closes
Location

Cork Albert Street railway station was on the Cork, Blackrock and Passage Railway (CBPR) in County Cork, Ireland.

== History ==
The station opened on 6 February 1873 replacing the former terminus of Cork Victoria Road railway station.

Regular passenger services were withdrawn on 12 September 1932.

== Routes ==
| Preceding station | Disused railways | Following station |
|---|---|---|
| Terminus | Cork, Blackrock and Passage Railway; Cork-Crosshaven | Show Ground Halt |
