= Crosshaven railway station =

Railway station in County Cork, Ireland

Crosshaven

General information
- Location: Cork, County Cork; Ireland
- Coordinates: 51.80326°N 8.30039°W

History
- Original company: Cork, Blackrock and Passage Railway
- Pre-grouping: Cork, Blackrock and Passage Railway
- Post-grouping: Great Southern Railways

Key dates
- 16 June 1903: Station opens
- 1 June 1932: Station closes
Location

Crosshaven railway station was on the Cork, Blackrock and Passage Railway in County Cork, Ireland.

== History ==
The station opened on 16 June 1903.

Passenger services were withdrawn on 12 September 1932.

== Routes ==
Preceding station	Disused railways	Following station
Carrigaline	Cork, Blackrock and Passage Railway; Cork-Crosshaven	Terminus
