= Cork Victoria Road railway station =

Railway station in County Cork, Ireland

Cork Victoria Road

General information
- Location: Cork, County Cork; Ireland

History
- Original company: Cork, Blackrock and Passage Railway
- Pre-grouping: Cork, Blackrock and Passage Railway
- Post-grouping: Great Southern Railways

Key dates
- 8 June 1850: Station opens
- 6 February 1873: Station closes

Cork Victoria Road railway station was on the Cork, Blackrock and Passage Railway in County Cork, Ireland.

== History ==
The station opened on 8 June 1850.

Passenger services were withdrawn on 6 February 1873, with the opening of Cork Albert Street railway station.

== Routes ==
Preceding station	Disused railways	Following station
Terminus	Cork, Blackrock and Passage Railway; Cork-Crosshaven	Blackrock
