= St Luke's Church, Douglas =

Anglican church in Cork, Ireland

St Luke's Church
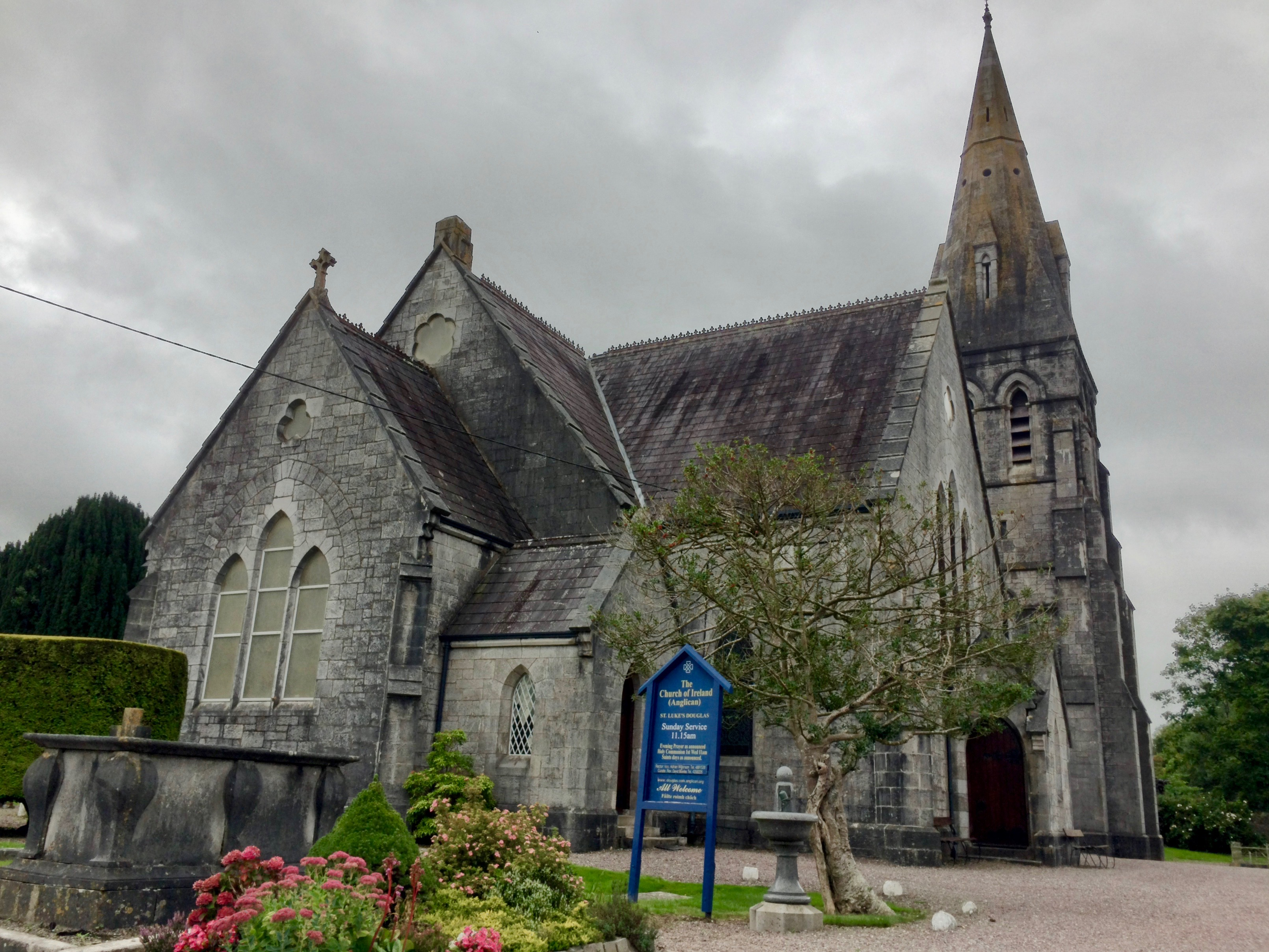
- Entrance and spire of St Luke's Church
- St Luke's Church
- 51.8750°N 8.4373°W
- Location: Churchyard Lane, Douglas, Cork
- Country: Ireland
- Denomination: Church of Ireland

History
- Consecrated: 1875

Architecture
- Architect(s): Osborne Cadwallader Edwards (main structure), W.H. Hill (spire)
- Years built: c. 1875 (main structure), 1885 (spire)

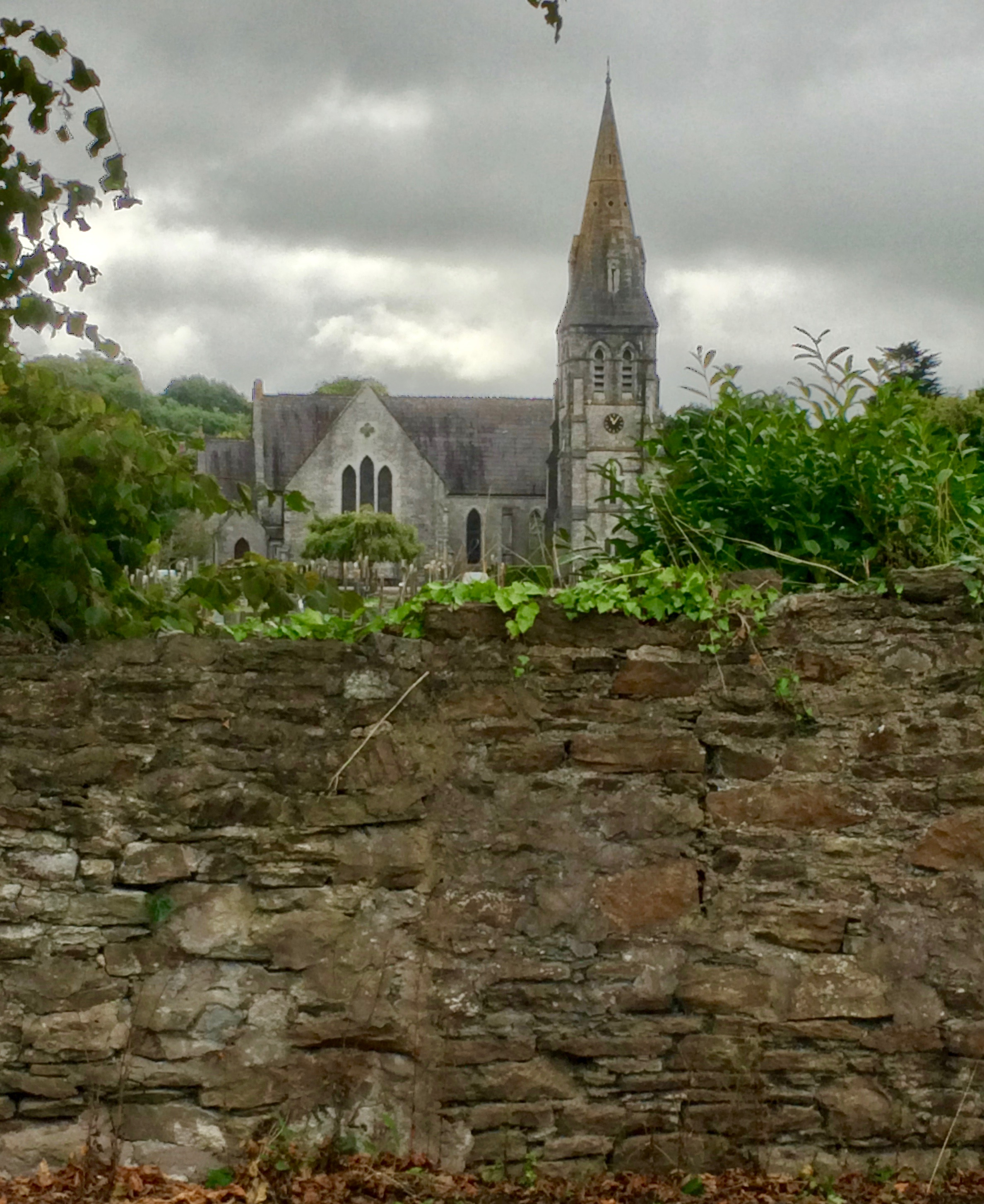
St Luke's Church, as viewed from Douglas Community Park

St Luke's Church is a Church of Ireland (Anglican) church in Douglas in Cork, Ireland. Built c. 1875 on the site of an earlier 18th-century church, it is dedicated to Luke the Evangelist. Originally a chapel of ease for the parish of Carrigaline, population growth led to Douglas being made a parish in its own right. It is part of the Douglas Union of Parishes, in the Diocese of Cork, Cloyne and Ross. The church is included in the Record of Protected Structures maintained by Cork City Council.

== History ==
Originally constructed in 1786 as a chapel of ease to Carrigaline, by 1875 Douglas had experienced population growth to the extent that Douglas was made a separate parish. A new church was completed, on the site the original 18th-century chapel, and was consecrated that same year. The rebuilt church was designed by Cork engineer Osborne Cadwallader Edwards. In 1885, the nave was lengthened and a tower and spire were added, designed by William Henry Hill.

Sir John Arnott and Dr Richard Caulfield are among those interred in St Luke's graveyard. A plaque to Hugh Lane, the Cork-born director of the National Gallery of Ireland who died in the Sinking of the Lusitania, was erected in the church by his sister in 1915.

== Architecture ==
The 19th century building was designed by Osborne Cadwallader Edwards. The church is cruciform, and its transepts have projected gable-fronted porches. The broached hexagonal spire is built with ashlar limestone.

Some of the building's stained glass windows were designed by William Burges, and the church's pipe organ is attributed to the JJ Binns company of Leeds.
