= Passage railway station =

Railway station in Ireland

Passage
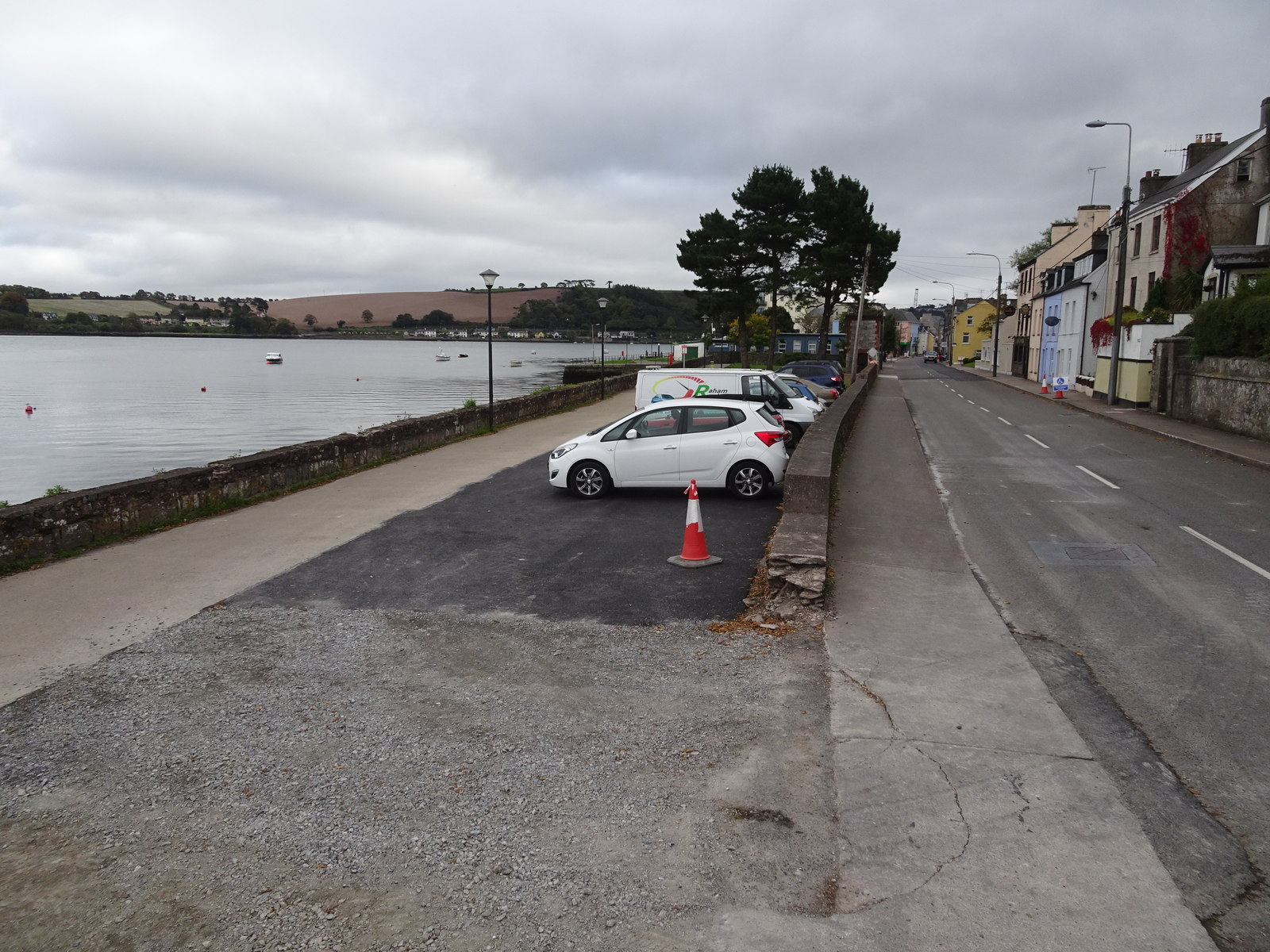
- The site of the former station, now occupied by a car park

General information
- Location: Passage West; Cork, County Cork; Ireland

History
- Original company: Cork, Blackrock and Passage Railway
- Pre-grouping: Cork, Blackrock and Passage Railway
- Post-grouping: Great Southern Railways

Key dates
- 8 June 1850: Station opens
- 12 September 1932: Station closes
Location

Passage railway station was on the Cork, Blackrock and Passage Railway in County Cork, Ireland.

== History ==
The station opened on 8 June 1850.

Passenger services were withdrawn on 12 September 1932.

== Routes ==
Preceding station	Disused railways	Following station
Rochestown	Cork, Blackrock and Passage Railway; Cork-Crosshaven	Glenbrook
