= Crossbarry =

Village in County Cork, Ireland

Crossbarry Crois an Bharraigh
- Village
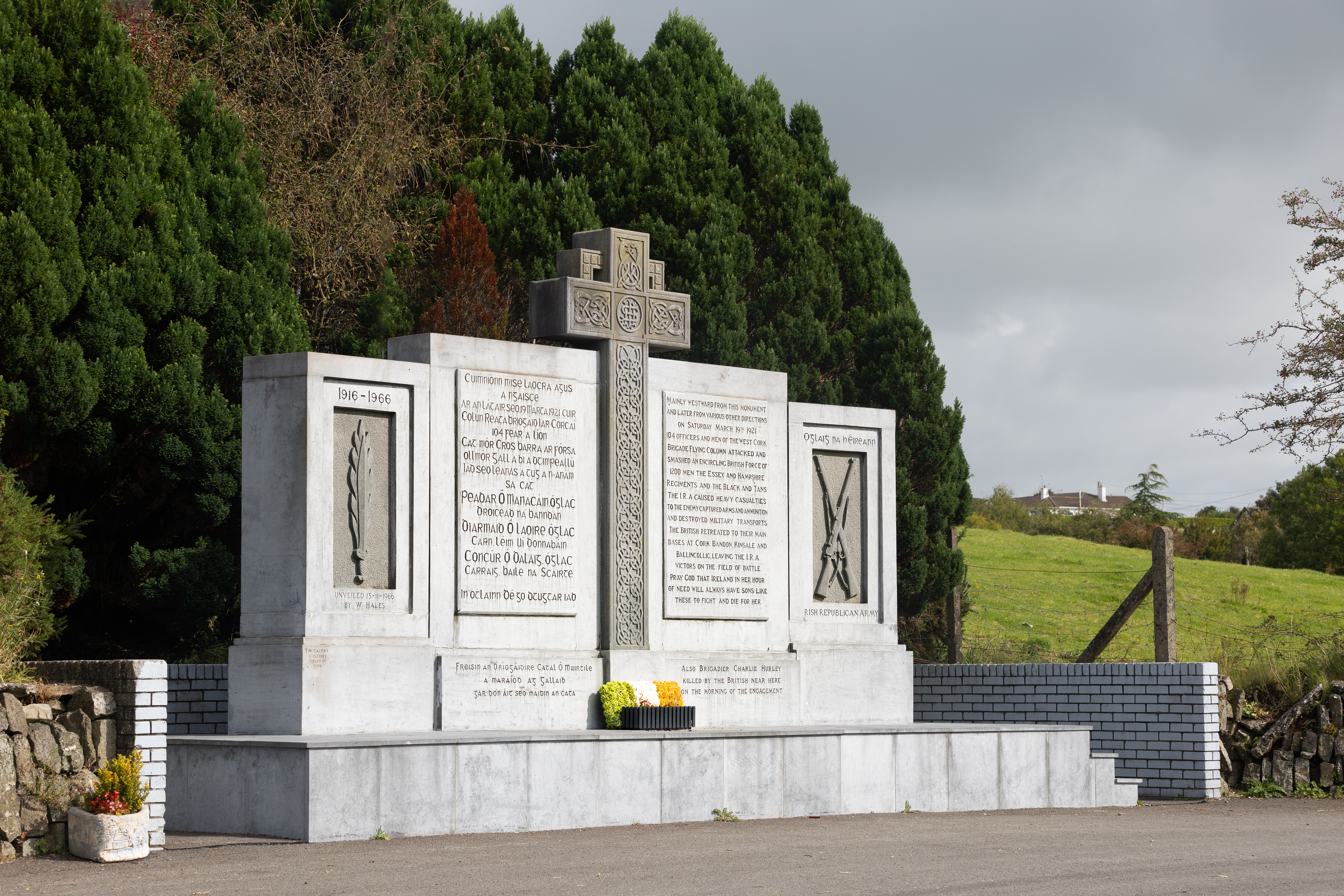
- Memorial to the Crossbarry ambush which took place during the Irish War of Independence

- Location in Ireland
- Coordinates: 51°48′07.88″N 08°38′41.06″W
- Country: Ireland
- Province: Munster
- County: County Cork

Population (2022)
  - Total: 399
- Time zone: UTC+0 (WET)
  - Summer (DST): UTC-1 (IST (WEST))

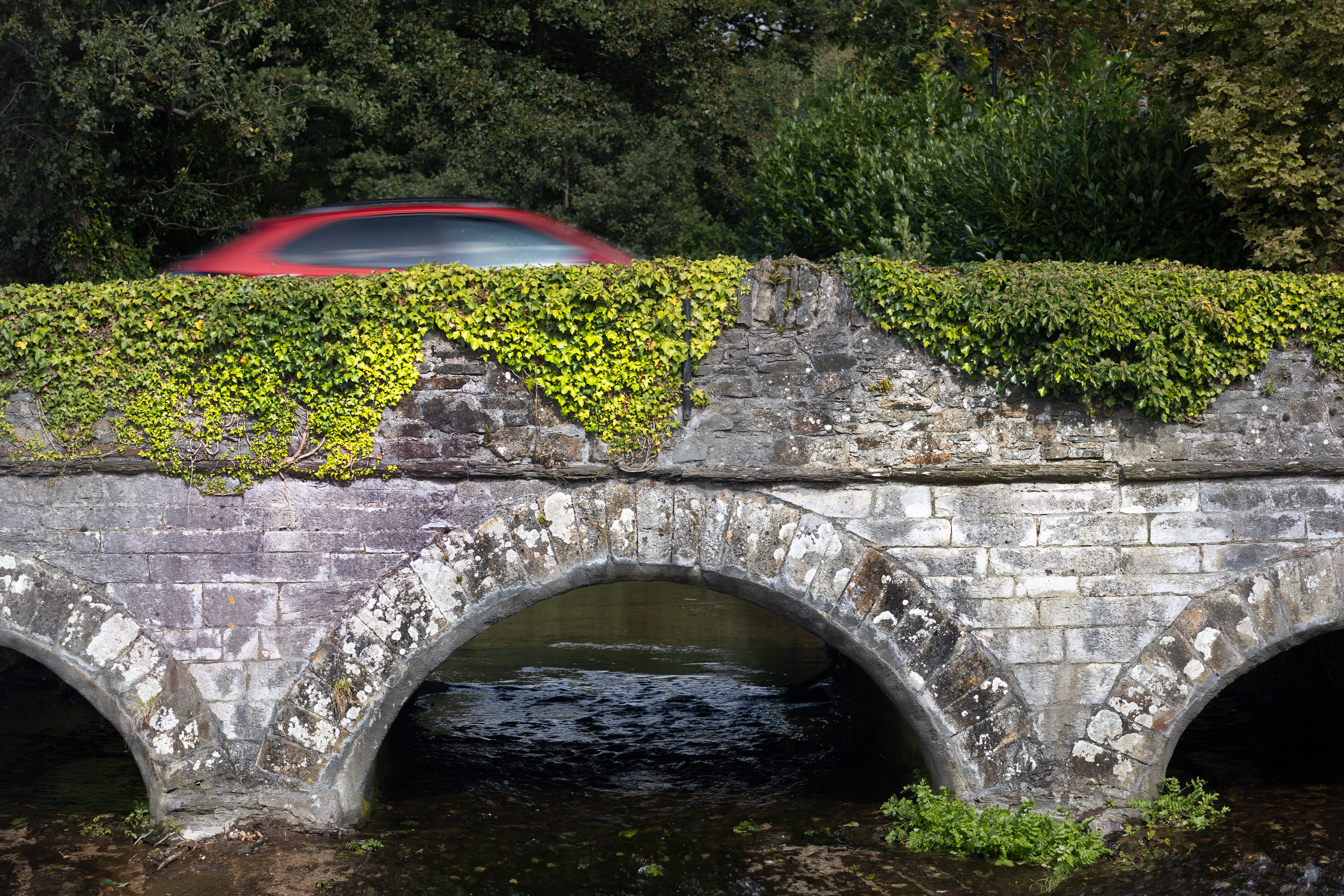
18th century bridge in the center of the town, crossing the River Owenabue

Crossbarry, or Cross Barry (Irish: Crois an Bharraigh), is a small village in County Cork, Ireland. It is 16 km southwest of the centre of Cork city (23 km by road, via the R589). The village is in Innishannon parish, and the River Owenabue flows through it. The West Cork Railway once ran through the village, and Junction railway station served as a connection to Kinsale, just to the east. The Crossbarry ambush took place at the village during the Irish War of Independence.

It has two schools nearby (Gurrane and Knockavilla national schools), as well as other creche, childcare and playschool facilities. In 2007, the road from Bandon was improved, bypassing the Crossbarry ambush memorial.

== Notable people ==
- Wayne Lordan, jockey
- Eoin Reardon, woodworker

== See also ==
- List of towns and villages in Ireland
