= Eoin Reardon =

Irish woodworker

- Born: 2001 or 2002; Crossbarry, Ireland
- Education: University College Cork
- Occupations: Social media personality; Woodworker

TikTok information
- Page: PintofPlane
- Followers: 3.5 million

YouTube information
- Channel: Eoin Reardon
- Subscribers: 1.89 million
- Views: 953 million
- Last updated: 11 September 2026

Eoin Reardon (born 2001 or 2002), also known as "pintofplane", is an Irish influencer and woodworker.

== Social media ==
Reardon taught himself the basics of woodworking during the pandemic lockdown. His first video was him using a hand plane. Reardon gains most of his video ideas from fans, answering their questions. Reardon gained his initial following on TikTok. In his videos, Reardon only uses hand tools, but uses power tools for commissions. As of 2024, Reardon had 3 million followers on TikTok and 1 million on YouTube. Reardon has said that over half of his followers claim to be of Irish heritage and over half of his followers are from the United States.

Over several videos, Reardon built a currach which he named Niamh Ōg (Young Niamh in English) due to it being the Kerry Naomhóg type currach, after the daughter of Manannán mac Lir, Niamh Cinn-Óir.

Reardon was nominated for "Highest Quality Creator of the Year" at the Ireland and United Kingdom TikTok awards.

== Personal life ==
Reardon is from Crossbarry in County Cork. He studied commerce at University College Cork for a period, but "dropped out [..] to follow his passion for carving". He sells some of the items he makes at craft fairs in Ireland.
