= Samuel Hayman =

Church of Ireland clergyman and writer

Samuel Hayman (27 July 1818 – 15 December 1886) was a Church of Ireland minister, and an antiquarian.

== Life ==
Hayman was the eldest son of Matthew Hayman of South Abbey, Youghal, County Cork, and his wife Helen, third daughter of Arundel Hill of Doneraile in the same county. Four members of the Hayman family had been mayors of Youghal in the 18th century; the Haymans had come to Ireland in 1629 and claimed a Norman ancestry. Samuel was educated in the town, and afterwards in Clonmel from the Rev Robert Bell; he entered Trinity College, Dublin in 1835, and graduated B.A. in 1839. He was ordained as deacon in the Church of Ireland in 1841, and to the priesthood in 1842.

He was curate of Glanworth to 1847, of Glanmire to 1849, and of Youghal to 1863. He was collated in 1863 to the rectory of Ardnageehy, and in 1867 to that of Doneraile, where he remained until 1872, when, under the new arrangements of the church of Ireland, he was elected to the rectory of Carrigaline, with the chapelry of Douglas annexed. In 1875 Douglas was constituted a separate benefice, and he took charge of it. During his incumbency he effected great improvements in the parish, including the restoration of the dilapidated St Luke's Church. Hayman was also a canon of Cork.

On 26 September 1854 he married, at St Anne's, Belfast, Emily, daughter of the Rev Mark Cassidy, chancellor of Kilfenora, County Clare, and perpetual curate of Newtownards, County Down; they had one child. Hayman died at Douglas rectory on 15 December 1886, and was buried in the adjacent churchyard.

== Works ==
Hayman contributed articles, in prose and verse, to The Dublin University Magazine, The Christian Examiner, The Church of England Magazine, The Gentleman's Magazine, The Journal of the Royal Historical and Archæological Association of Ireland, The Topographer and Genealogist, and The Patrician; the fifth volume of The Patrician was inscribed by its editor, Sir Bernard Burke, "to the Rev Samuel Hayman, one of the ablest contributors, and a constant coadjutor in the author's genealogical works".

Besides several separate sermons and lectures, Hayman was author of the following:

1. Annals of Youghal, 1848.
2. Account of the Present State of Youghal Church, including Memorials of the Boyles, the College, and Sir Walter Raleigh's House, 1850.
3. Annals of Youghal, 2nd series 1851.
4. Handbook for Youghal, with Annals of the Town, 3rd series 1852.
5. Notes and Records of the Ancient Religious Foundations at Youghal and its Vicinity, 1854; new editions 1855 and 1859.
6. New Handbook for Youghal, with Annals of the Town, 4th series 1858.
7. Guide to Youghal, Ardmore, and the Blackwater, with Map and Illustrations, 1860.
8. Sketch of the Blackwater from Youghal to Fermoy, 1860.
9. Illustrated Guide to St. Mary's Collegiate Church and the other Ancient Religious Foundations at Youghal, 1861.
10. Illustrated Guide to the Blackwater and Ardmore, 1861.
11. Memorials of the Ancient Religious Foundations at Youghal and its Vicinity, 1863.
12. Guide to St. Mary's Collegiate Church, Youghal, 1865; new edition 1869.
13. About Footsteps, in twelve chapters, 1869.
14. Looking Upward, a Country Pastor's Reveries, 1871.
15. Papers from a Parsonage, 1872.
16. Passages from a Commonplace Book, 1873.
17. Criteria; or the Divine Examen, 1873.
18. Ministrations; or Feeding the Flock of God, 1875.

He also edited Unpublished Geraldine Documents (which he contributed to The Journal of the Royal Historical and Archæological Association of Ireland), four parts, 1870–81.
