= Carrigaline railway station =

Railway station in County Cork, Ireland

Coordinates: 51.8181°N 8.3885°W

Carrigaline
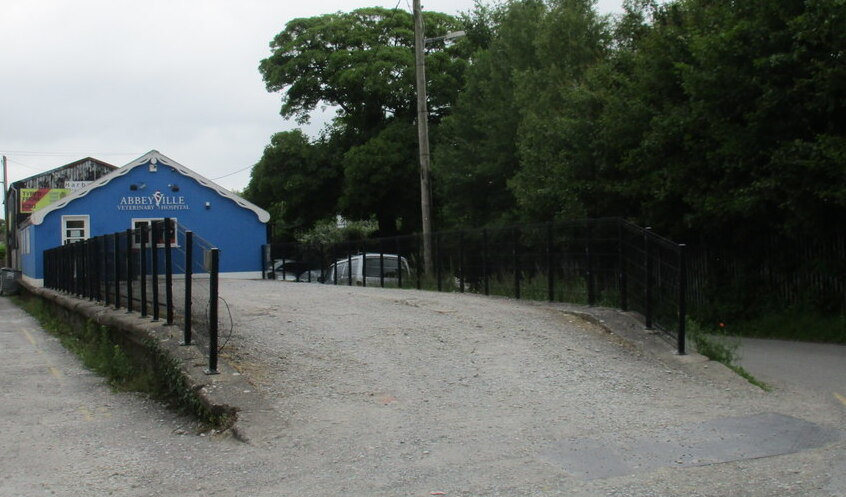
- Former platform and station building at Carrigaline

General information
- Location: Carrigaline; County Cork; Ireland

History
- Original company: Cork, Blackrock and Passage Railway
- Pre-grouping: Cork, Blackrock and Passage Railway
- Post-grouping: Great Southern Railways

Key dates
- 16 June 1903: Station opens
- 12 September 1932: Station closes
Location
- Location within County Cork Location within Ireland

Carrigaline railway station was on the Cork, Blackrock and Passage Railway in County Cork, Ireland. It served the town of Carrigaline. As of 2023, the station building still exists, being used as a veterinary hospital.

== History ==
The station opened on 16 June 1903.

Passenger services were withdrawn on 12 September 1932.

== Routes ==
Preceding station	Disused railways	Following station
Rafeen	Cork, Blackrock and Passage Railway; Cork-Crosshaven	Crosshaven
