= River Owenabue =

River in County Cork, Ireland, flowing to Cork Harbour

Owenabue
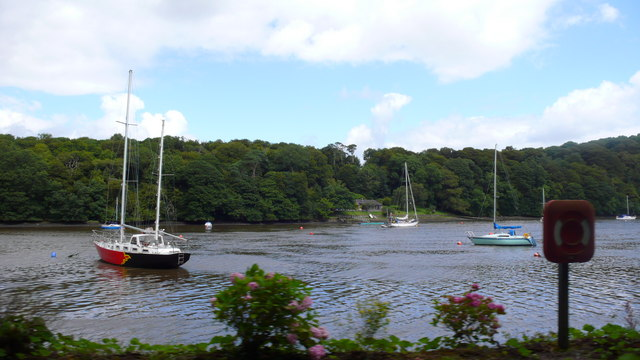
- Owenabue River, between Crosshaven and Carrigaline

Physical characteristics
- Source
  - location: County Cork, Ireland
  - coordinates: 51°49′15″N 8°27′29″W
- Mouth
  - location: Carrigaline, County Cork, Ireland
  - coordinates: 51°48′48″N 08°23′43″W

The River Owenabue (Irish: Abhainn na Baoi), also spelled "Owenboy", is a river in County Cork, Ireland.

== Geography ==
River Owenabue rises just north of Crossbarry and flows east towards the sea for roughly 20 miles (32 km). It flows through Crossbarry and on to the small village of Halfway. It then reaches Ballinhassig where it widens into Ballygarvan. It then meanders through Ballea Woods into Carrigaline, and onto Crosshaven where it enters Cork Harbour near Curraghbinny. The area is known as the Owenabue Valley. Otters and herons are seen on the river, and the heron has become a symbol of the area. 10 bridges cross the river.

== History ==
The Royal Munster Yacht Club (now merged with the Royal Cork Yacht Club) was based on the Owenabue River.
