= Passage West =

Port town in Cork Harbour, Ireland

Passage West An Pasáiste Thiar
- Town
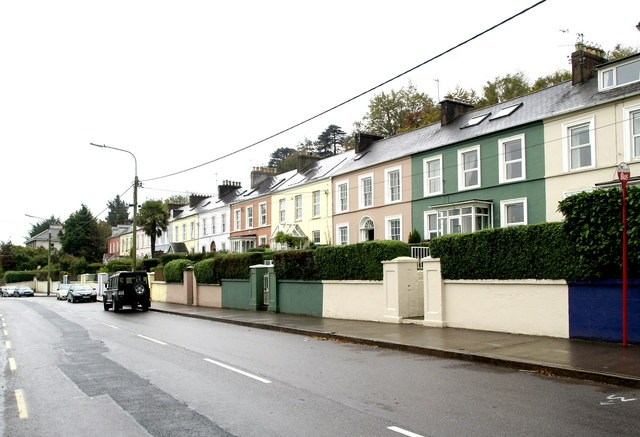
- Cork Street, Passage West

- Location in Ireland
- Coordinates: 51.8713°N 8.3352°W
- Country: Ireland
- Province: Munster
- County: County Cork

Area
  - Total: 5.5 km^{2} (2.1 sq mi)

Population (2022)
  - Total: 6,051
  - Density: 1,100/km^{2} (2,800/sq mi)
- (includes neighbouring Monkstown)
- Time zone: UTC±0 (WET)
  - Summer (DST): UTC+1 (IST)
- Eircode routing key: T12
- Telephone area code: +353(0)21
- Irish Grid Reference: W767687

Passage West (locally known as "Passage"; Irish: An Pasáiste Thiar) is a port town in County Cork, Ireland, situated on the west bank of Cork Harbour, some 10 km south-east of Cork city. Passage West was designated a conservation area in the 2003 Cork County Development Plan.

== History ==
In 1752, in the Market House, John Wesley – the founder of Methodism – addressed the people of Passage whom he described afterwards, as "as dull a congregation as I have seen". From 1763, two fairs were held there yearly, one on the first of May, and the other on 25 July. The fairs were held in the vicinity of a hill, hence called Fair Hill. According to Shaw Mason's "Survey of the South of Ireland", Irish was the language spoken in 1809 by the inhabitants of the town's cottages and similarly humble dwellings.

The largest of Passage's industries were the two dockyards. Hennessy's yard was situated in what is now Fr O'Flynn Park. In 1815, this yard was involved in launching the City of Cork, the first steamship built in Ireland. The other and bigger dockyard was the Royal Victoria Dockyard, which was laid down in 1832 and cost £150,000 to build and equip. It received its name from Queen Victoria on her first visit to Cork in 1849. The yard changed ownership several times, and during World War I was employing over 1,000 people. By 1925, most of the workers were paid off owing to a slump in the shipbuilding trade, and it completely closed down in 1931.

In 1836, a quay was built where the vessels could berth and land their passengers and freight. The opening of a railway line to Cobh (then known as Queenstown) caused the demise of the Passage ferry; however, in 1993 a car ferry service was opened between nearby Glenbrook and Carrigaloe on Great Island.

In 1838, the first steamship to cross the Atlantic to America was under the command of Richard Roberts. The paddle shaft of The Sirius can be seen today and forms part of a memorial to Roberts and his achievement. It is near the site of the now-demolished baths on the road to Monkstown just beyond the Cross River Ferry. There were several hydropathic establishments in the town. The Victoria Baths were opened about 1838.

In John Windele's Historical and Descriptive Notices of the City of Cork, published in 1839, Passage is described as consisting of two old irregular streets extending in a kind of forked direction.

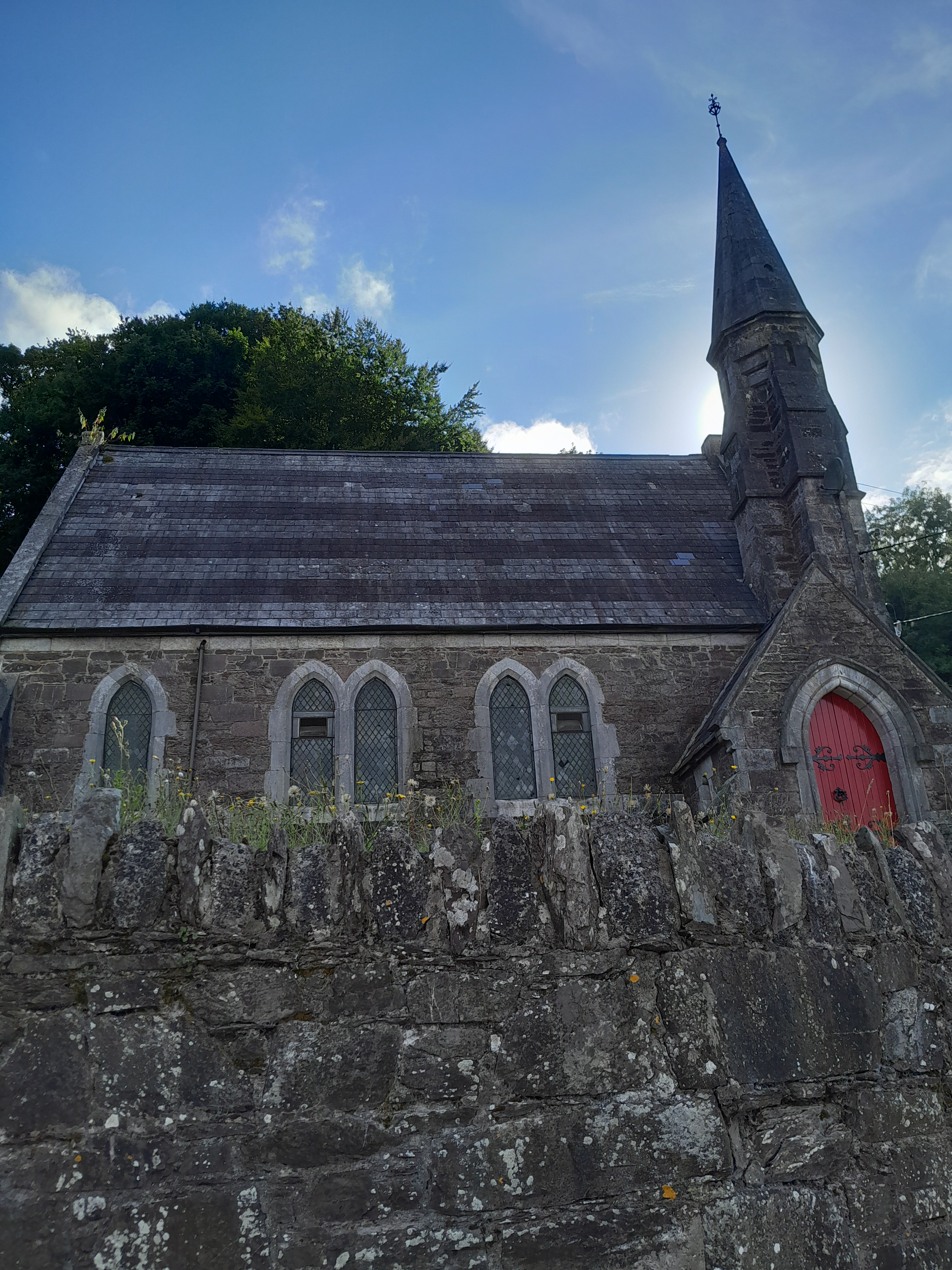
Church in Passage West

The opening of Passage railway station on the Cork, Blackrock and Passage Railway in June 1850 increased visitors to the town, which was for some time the railway terminus. The railway was extended to Monkstown in August 1902 and two years later to Crosshaven. From that time Passage was no longer popular as a tourist resort, Crosshaven taking its place. Passage railway station opened on 8 June 1850 and finally closed with the rest of the line on 12 September 1932.

Passage West was affected by the events of the Irish Civil War, and saw a large-scale landing of National Army troops on 2 August 1922. These 1,500 men, equipped with artillery and armour as part of a wider offensive, went on to capture Cork city from the badly armed Anti-Treaty Irish Republican Army troops who were holding it. Many of the local homes took in the soldiers and fed them. It is said that Captain Jeremiah Collins, who was well known in Cork circles for aiding the cause, not only welcomed them into his home, but to mark the victorious landing, he raised the flag in front of his house "Carrigmahon", which overlooked the water.

Following the closure of the shipyard, the newly formed urban district council invested heavily in local infrastructure. Projects included Passage West Town Hall which built on the spot from which City of Cork was launched. The Passage West Maritime Museum was established in Passage West Town Hall in 2018.

== Recent development ==
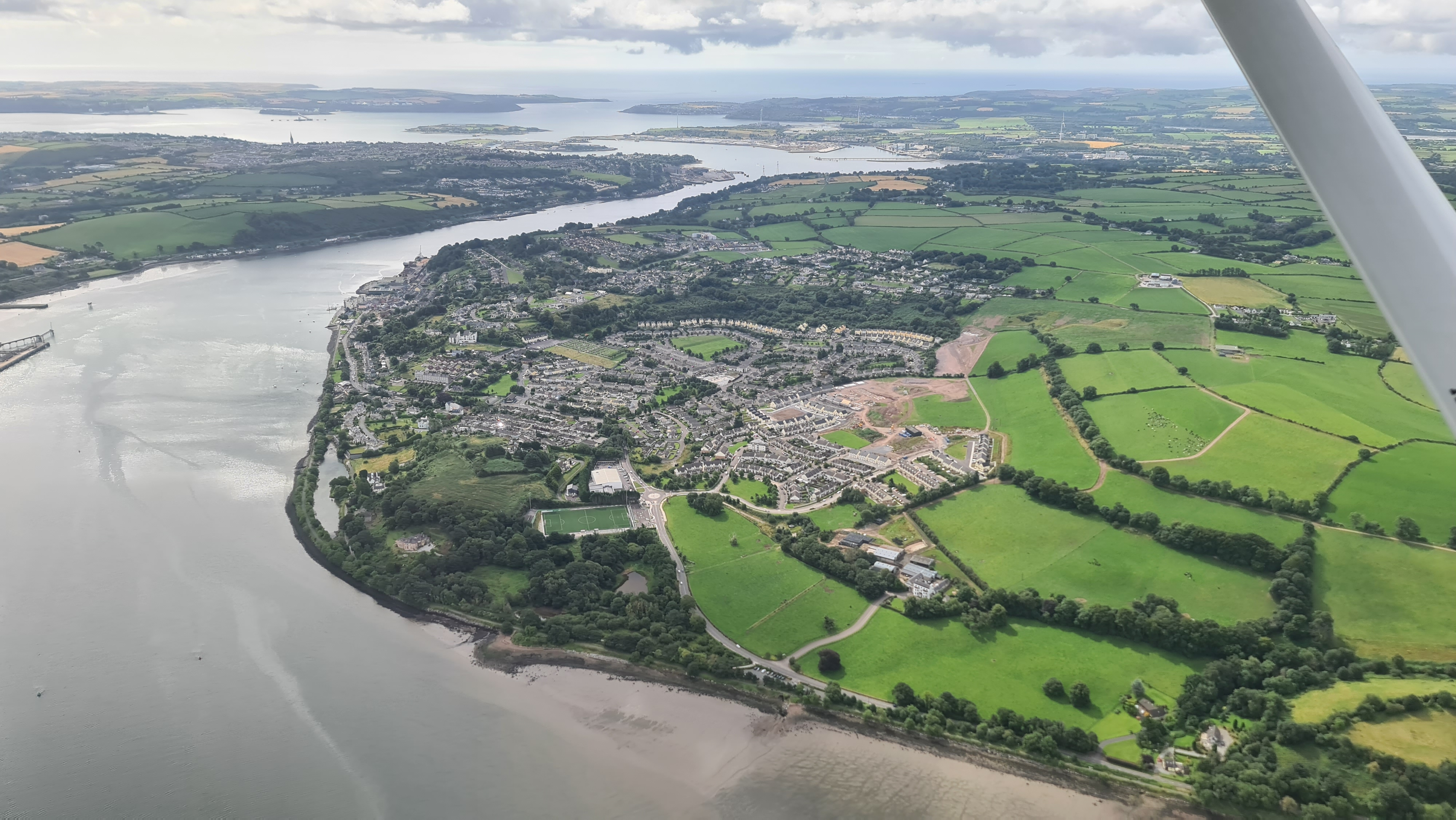
Aerial view of Passage West area (2023)

In the 20 years between the 1991 and 2011 census, the population of the Passage West area grew by 60% (from 3,606 as of the 1991 census, to 5,790 by the 2011 census). According to the 2016 census, approximately 50% of the private housing in the area was built in this period.

In 2007, a property development company proposed plans for the possible redevelopment of the former Passage dockyard site. However the project was subsequently cancelled and, in 2019, the site was "taken off the market".

== Administration ==
In March 1920, Passage West, together with the neighbouring village of Monkstown, was constituted as a local authority with town commissioners under the Towns Improvement Act (Ireland) 1854 within the rural district of Cork. The first local elections were held on 14 July 1920. It became an urban district in 1921. Owing to abuses, a public inquiry was held in 1938, and the urban district council (UDC) dissolved. In 1942, it was deurbanised, and the UDC was replaced by town commissioners. This gave a greater role in the administration of the town to Cork County Council. This became a town council in 2002. The council had nine members. All town councils in Ireland were abolished in 2014 under the Local Government Reform Act 2014. Cork County Council assumed direct control of the former town council's functions in May 2014.

== Sport ==
The town is home to Passage West GAA. The local association football (soccer) club, Passage AFC, plays at Rockenham Park on Cork Road, with other facilities at Maulbaun.

== Transport ==
Passage is served by the 216 bus, which operates from Monkstown to Cork University Hospital via Douglas and Cork city. The town is also served by the 223 bus from Ringaskiddy to Cork. Both the 216 and 223 are operated by Bus Éireann.

A ferry service, the Cross River Ferry, operates from Glenbrook (near Passage) to Carrigaloe (near Cobh) across a channel of Cork Harbour.

The town was previously served by Passage railway station on the Cork, Blackrock and Passage Railway line. This closed in 1932.

== Twinning ==
Passage West is twinned with the French town of Chasseneuil-du-Poitou.

== See also ==
- List of towns and villages in Ireland
- St. Peter's Community School
