= Carrigaline =

Town in County Cork, Ireland

Carrigaline Carraig Uí Leighin
- Town
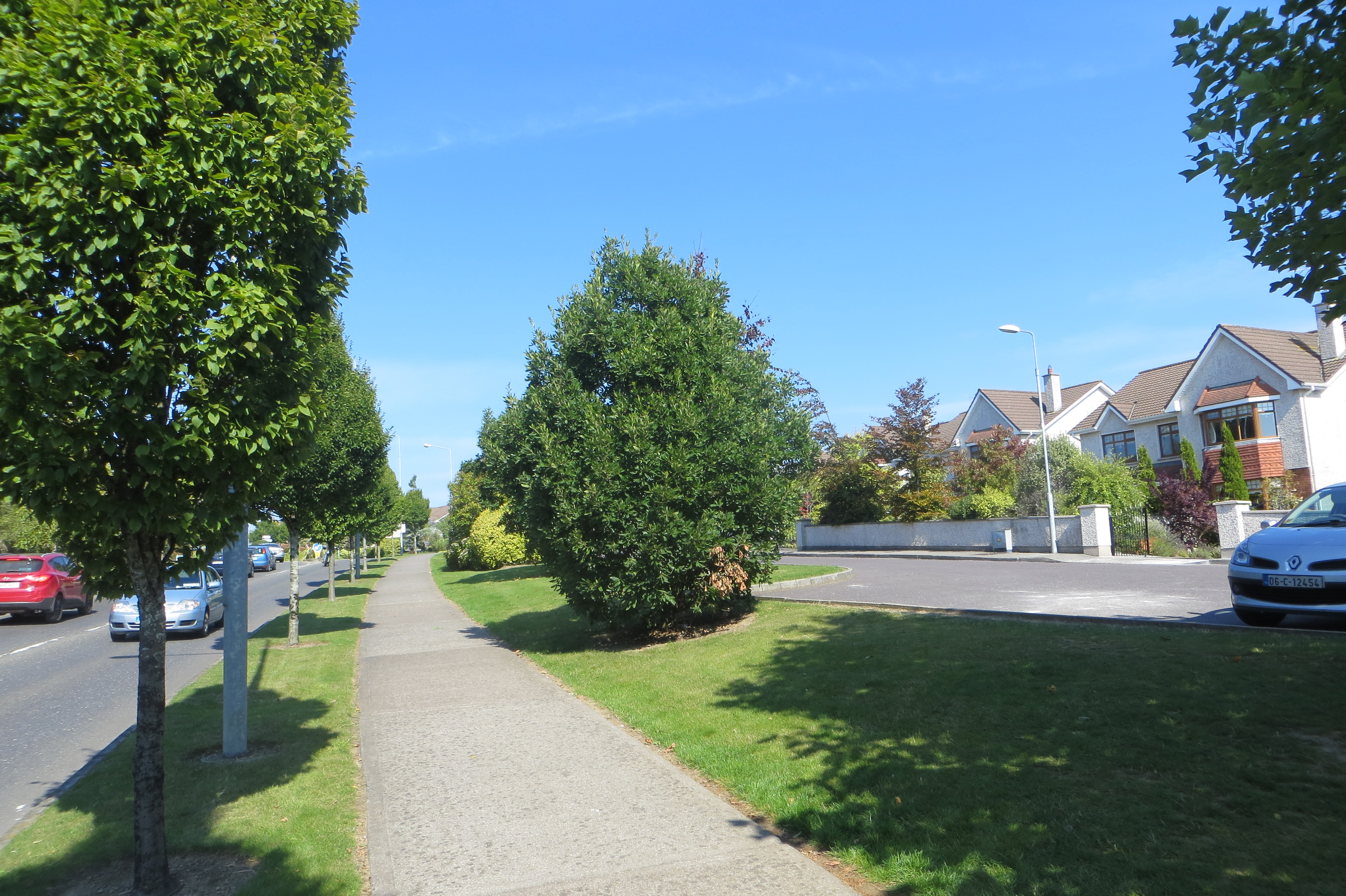
- Carrigaline – Heron's Wood

- Location in Ireland
- Coordinates: 51°48′59″N 8°23′29″W
- Country: Ireland
- Province: Munster
- County: Cork

Area
  - Total: 4.6 km^{2} (1.8 sq mi)
- Elevation: 17 m (56 ft)

Population (2022)
  - Total: 18,239
  - Density: 4,000/km^{2} (10,000/sq mi)
- Time zone: UTC±0 (WET)
  - Summer (DST): UTC+1 (IST)
- Eircode routing key: P43
- Telephone area code: +353(0)21
- Irish Grid Reference: W727625

Historical population
Year	Pop.	±%
1841	603	—
1851	780	+29.4%
1861	648	−16.9%
1871	439	−32.3%
1881	576	+31.2%
1891	438	−24.0%
1901	476	+8.7%
1911	518	+8.8%
1926	379	−26.8%
1936	315	−16.9%
1946	357	+13.3%
1951	492	+37.8%
1956	606	+23.2%
1961	688	+13.5%
1966	772	+12.2%
1971	971	+25.8%
1981	4,147	+327.1%
1986	5,893	+42.1%
1991	6,482	+10.0%
1996	7,025	+8.4%
2002	9,345	+33.0%
2006	11,282	+20.7%
2011	14,775	+31.0%
2016	15,770	+6.7%
2022	18,239	+15.7%

Carrigaline (/kærɪɡəˈlaɪn/; Irish: Carraig Uí Leighin, meaning 'rock of Ó Leighin') is a town and civil parish in County Cork, Ireland, situated on the River Owenabue. Located about 12 kilometres (7.5 mi) south of Cork city, and with a population of 18,239 people, it is one of the largest commuter towns in the county. The R611 regional road passes through the town, and it is just off the N28 national primary route to Ringaskiddy. Carrigaline grew rapidly in the late 20th century, from a village of a few hundred people into a thriving commuter town although some locals still refer to it as "the village". The town is one of the key gateways to west Cork, especially for those who arrive by ferry from France. Carrigaline is within the Cork South-Central Dáil constituency.

== Economy ==
Carrigaline Pottery, situated in Main Street, closed in 1979, but was subsequently re-opened and run as a co-operative for many years after that. Despite its small size, the village also had a small cinema, owned and run by the Cogan family. Neither the pottery nor the cinema exist today. The Carrigdhoun newspaper is published in Carrigaline. The town has four banks, a credit union and a number of supermarkets.

== Demographics ==
As of the 2016 census, Carrigaline had a population of 15,770. Of this population, 83% were white Irish, less than 1% white Irish traveller, 11% other white ethnicities, 2% black, 1% Asian, 1% other, and less than 1% had not stated their ethnicity. In terms of religion the town is 81% Catholic, 8% other stated religion, 11% with no religion, and less than 1% no stated religion. By the 2022 census, the population had grown to 18,239.

== International relations ==
Carrigaline has town twinning agreements with the commune of Guidel in Brittany, France, and with the town of Kirchseeon, in Bavaria, Germany.

== Transport ==
Carrigaline is served by a number of Bus Éireann bus routes. These include route 220 (Ovens via Ballincollig, Cork city centre and Douglas), 220X (Ovens via Cork city centre, onwards to Fountainstown and Crosshaven), 225 (Kent Station via the city centre and Cork Airport, onwards to Haulbowline), and 225L (Carrigaline Industrial Estate via Ringaskiddy to Haulbowline).

Carrigaline railway station closed in 1932.

== Culture ==
=== Sport ===
Local sporting organisations include association football (soccer) clubs Avondale United FC and Carrigaline United A.F.C., Gaelic Athletic Association club Carrigaline GAA, rugby union club Carrigaline RFC, and other tennis, badminton, basketball, golf, and martial arts clubs.

=== Religion ===
Carrigaline's Roman Catholic church, the church of 'Our Lady and John', was built in 1957. The local Baptist church was founded in 1987. The Church of Ireland (Anglican) church, St Mary's church, dates to 1824.

== Notable people ==
- Francis Hodder (1906–1943), first-class cricketer, rugby union player and Royal Air Force officer
- Aaron Drinan (b.1998), association footballer
- Nicholas Murphy (b.1978), former Gaelic footballer
- Simon Coveney (b.1972), former Tánaiste, maintained a constituency office in Carrigaline
- Michael McGrath (b.1976), politician and European Commissioner for Democracy, Justice, the Rule of Law and Consumer Protection, lives in Carrigaline

== See also ==
- Carrigaline railway station (1903–1932)
- Carrigaline Farmhouse Cheese
