= Cork City Railways =

Railway in Ireland

The Cork City Railways were constructed in 1911 and opened in 1912 to connect the Irish standard gauge systems north and south of the River Lee in Cork, Ireland.

In the 19th century, Cork city had a population of the order of 80,000 and was served by up to five operating companies, mostly to separate stations around the city.

== Street railways ==
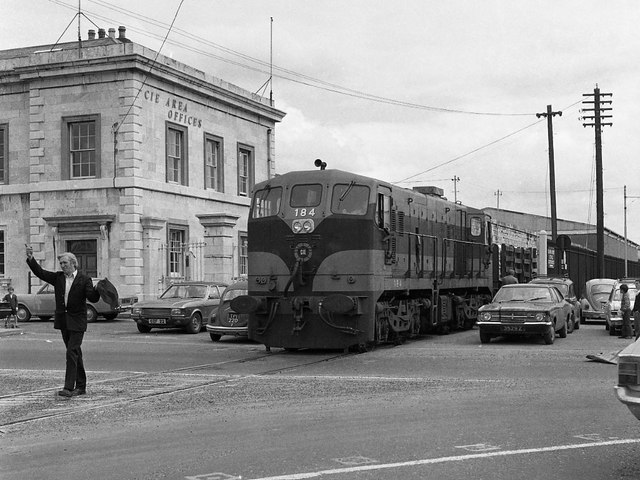
Train traversing Cork City Railways by Albert Quay

As well as street railways and tramways in the central area of Cork city, the Cork and Muskerry Light Railway also had street lines running through the western suburbs, later shared with trams.

=== Cork Electric Tramways and Lighting Company ===
The Cork trams started in 1898 and ran until 1931. The gauge of 900 mm (2 ft 11 7/16 in) was designed to be compatible with that of the Cork and Muskerry Light Railway so it could operate over some of the light railways route. The tram network also linked to the Cork, Blackrock and Passage Railway the gauge of which was reduced from 5 ft 3 in (1,600 mm) to 3 ft (914 mm) at this time for compatibility.

=== Cork City Railways ===
Cork City Railways Act 1906
- Act of Parliament
- Parliament of the United Kingdom
- Long title: An Act to incorporate the Cork City Railways Company and to authorise the Company to construct railways and other works in the county borough of Cork and for other purposes.
- Citation: 6 Edw. 7. c. clxxii

Dates
- Royal assent: 4 August 1906

The Cork City Railways were authorised by the Cork City Railways Act 1906 (6 Edw. 7. c. clxxii), constructed in 1911 and opened in 1912 to connect the Irish standard gauge systems north and south of the River Lee in Cork, Ireland. Half the finance of £150,000 for the Company was put forward by the Great Western Railway (GWR) company of the United Kingdom who had previously invested in the Fishguard, Rosslare and Waterford route. Three of the four company directors were also from the GWR.The company owned no locomotives and the system was operated by other railway companies.

There were two lines, the first starting west from Glanmire Road station before curving to cross the two channels of the River Lee, and the electric tramway, to pass by Cork Albert Quay railway station and join the Cork, Bandon and South Coast Railway (CBSCR) immediately thereafter. This line had various branches to docks. This line may briefly have had a scheduled passenger service in the summer of 1914.

The second line ran from the CBSCR goods yard to Victoria Quays.

Usage of the Cork City Railways lines reduced with the closure of the old CBSCR route in 1961; however, freight movements to Albert and Victoria Quays continued until 1976, leaving only a few tracks close to Glanmire Road.

== Train operating companies in Cork City ==
=== Cork, Bandon and South Coast Railway ===
The Cork, Bandon and South Coast Railway did not start from Cork. Instead, in 1849, they opened the first section between Bandon and Ballinhassig in December 1849. After financial problems, they reached Cork Albert Quay two years later, after completion of the Ballinhassig tunnel and the Chetwynd Viaduct. As the company extended, it was possible to travel the mainline to Bantry, and branches to Kinsale, Clonakilty and Baltimore, and by narrow-gauge from Skibbereen to Schull. The first major closure was the branch line to Kinsale, which closed in 1931. The remaining majority of the system closed in March 1961, with the track lifted from March 1962 onwards.

=== Cork, Blackrock and Passage Railway ===
Cork Albert Street opened in 1873, replacing the earlier 1850 Victoria Road terminus at City Park. The station served the line to Passage West, with later extensions to Carrigaline and Crosshaven. The line was originally 5 ft 3in gauge but was converted to 3 ft gauge in 1898. It closed in 1932.

=== Cork and Macroom Direct Railway ===
Cork Capwell (opened September 1879, closed March 1925) was the terminus for the Cork and Macroom Direct Railway. It was situated close to the CBSC and CBP stations.

=== Cork and Muskerry Light Railway ===
The Cork and Muskerry Light Railway had its terminus Cork Western Road towards the west of the city centre, near the banks of the River Lee. From Western Road, it was possible to travel from Cork to the region of Muskerry, with destinations including Coachford, Blarney and later Donoughmore. The terminus was open from 08.08.1887 to 31.12.1934.

=== Cork and Youghal Railway ===
Cork Summerhill was the original terminus of the C&Y, but when it was taken over by the G&SW, they created a combined station at Cork Glanmire Road for through workings.

=== Great Southern and Western Railway ===
Cork Penrose Quay was the original station, which was replaced by Cork Glanmire Road on amalgamation with the Cork and Youghal Railway. The Glanmire Road station is the only station that remains open for passenger or freight traffic, and is still connected to the main Cork-Dublin line via the mid-19th century Kilnap Viaduct and associated tunnel. On the 50th anniversary of the Easter Uprising, Glanmire Road station was renamed Cork Kent Station after Thomas Kent.

== See also ==
- Cork Suburban Rail
