= Junction station =

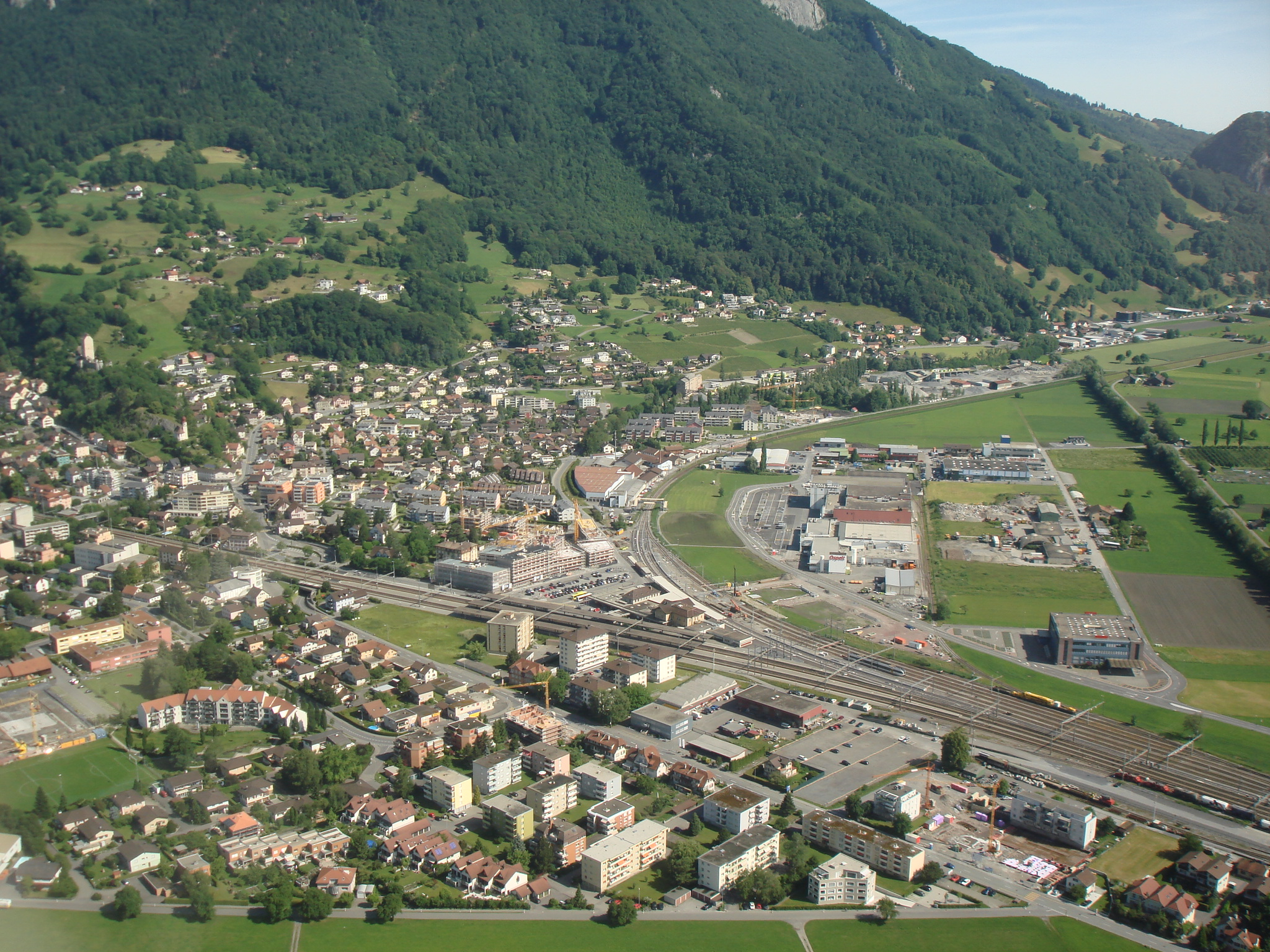
Sargans railway station (Switzerland) is a junction station located on the junction (Keilbahnhof) of two railway lines

Junction station usually refers to a railway station situated either on or close to a rail junction, where lines to two or more destinations diverge.

Many junction stations have multiple platform faces to enable trains for multiple destinations to stand at the station at the same time, but this is not necessary.

There are many stations with the word "junction" in their title, such as:

== In Australia ==
- Eagle Junction railway station
- Shellharbour Junction railway station
- Yass Junction railway station
- Bondi Junction railway station

== In Canada ==
- Hervey-Jonction railway station
- Sudbury Junction railway station
- Trenton Junction, Ontario railway station

== In India ==
- Gaya Junction
- Varanasi Junction
- Dhanbad Junction

== In Indonesia ==
=== Central Java ===
- Solo Balapan

=== East Java ===
- Wonokromo

=== Jakarta ===
- Ancol
- Duri
- Jatinegara
- Manggarai
- Tanah Abang

=== North Sumatra ===
- Medan

=== West Java ===
- Cirebon
- Cirebon Prujakan
- Padalarang

== In Ireland ==
=== Historical ===
- Fintona Junction railway station
- Bundoran Junction railway station
- Cookstown Junction railway station
- Ballyclare Junction railway station
- Limavady Junction railway station
- Ballynahinch Junction railway station
- Inny Junction railway station
- Junction railway station
- Kilfree Junction railway station
- Dromin Junction railway station
- Navan Junction railway station
- Clonakilty Junction railway station
- Tooban Junction railway station
- Coachford Junction railway station

=== In Use ===
- Howth Junction railway station
- Limerick Junction railway station
- Manulla Junction railway station
- Cobh Junction railway station

== In Spain ==
- Martorell Enllaç station, on the Llobregat–Anoia Line
- Empalme station on the Valencia Metro
- Maçanet-Massanes railway station, previously called Empalme

== In the United Kingdom ==
- Hellifield railway station
- Abergavenny Junction railway station
- Abingdon Junction railway station
- Alton Heights Junction railway station
- Alyth Junction railway station
- Bala Junction railway station
- Barnstaple Junction railway station
- Beckenham Junction station
- Boscarne Junction railway station
- Bowling Junction railway station (West Yorkshire)
- Broom Junction railway station
- Buildwas Junction railway station
- Burscough Junction railway station
- Chard Junction railway station
- Clapham Junction railway station
- Coaley Junction railway station
- Coombe Junction Halt railway station
- Dalry Junction railway station
- Dalston Junction railway station
- Derby Junction railway station
- Dovey Junction railway station
- Effingham Junction railway station
- Egginton Junction railway station
- Evercreech Junction railway station
- Folkestone Junction railway station
- Georgemas Junction railway station
- Grange Court Junction railway station
- Halwill Junction railway station
- Haxey Junction railway station
- Holt Junction railway station
- Ilkeston Junction and Cossall railway station
- Junction Road railway station
- Junction Road Halt railway station
- Killin Junction railway station
- Llandudno Junction railway station
- Loughborough Junction railway station
- Lydbrook Junction railway station
- Lydney Junction railway station
- Maud Junction railway station
- Maybole Junction railway station
- Middleton Junction railway station
- Millwall Junction railway station
- Mitcham Junction station
- Morebath Junction railway station
- Motherwell railway station
- Northolt Junction railway station
- Norwood Junction railway station
- Pen-y-Mount Junction railway station
- Reedness Junction railway station
- Riccarton Junction railway station
- Roudham Junction railway station
- Royton Junction railway station
- St Helens Junction railway station
- Seaton Junction railway station
- Severn Tunnel Junction railway station
- Settle Junction railway station
- Sidmouth Junction railway station
- Smallbrook Junction railway station
- Stepney Junction railway station
- Stourbridge Junction railway station
- Swanwick Junction railway station
- Tiverton Junction railway station
- Todd Lane Junction railway station
- Tooting Junction railway station
- Tryfan Junction railway station
- Verney Junction railway station
- Watford Junction railway station
- Whitacre Junction railway station
- Willesden Junction railway station
- Woodhall Junction railway station
- Yarwell Junction railway station
- Yeovil Junction railway station

== In the United States ==
- Ancona station (Illinois), no longer used for service
- Broadway Junction (BMT Canarsie Line)
- Clybourn station, Illinois
- Jamaica station, New York
- Joliet Union Station, Illinois
- Princeton Junction station, New Jersey
- Secaucus Junction, New Jersey
- Vancouver station (Washington)
- Wayne Junction station, Pennsylvania

== In Thailand ==
=== Historical ===
- U Tapao Junction (Songkhla Province)

=== In use ===
- Bangsue Junction
- Ban Phachi Junction
- Ban Dara Junction
- Kaeng Khoi Junction
- Thanon Chira Junction
- Bua Yai Junction
- Chachoengsao Junction
- Khlong Sip Kao Junction
- Si Racha Junction
- Khao Chi Chan Junction
- Taling Chan Junction
- Nong Pladuk Junction
- Ban Thung Pho Junction
- Thung Song Junction
- Khao Chum Thong Junction
- Haad Yai Junction
- Nong Bua Junction
- Ban Phai Na Bun Junction
- Chumphon Junction
