= Upton and Innishannon railway station =

Railway station in Ireland

Upton and Innishannon
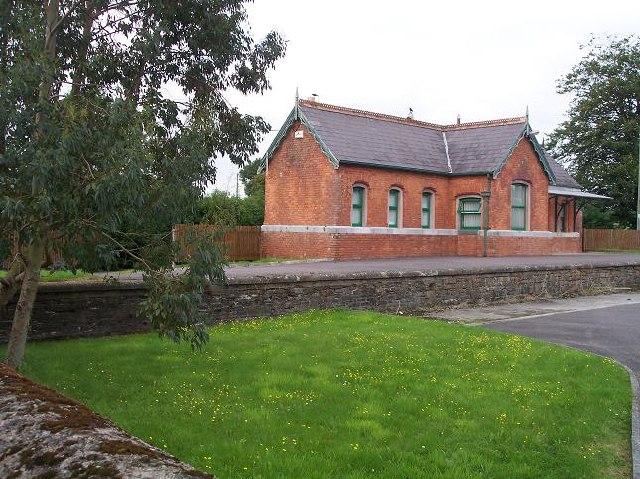
- The remaining station building, photographed in September 2005

General information
- Location: Upton, County Cork; Ireland
- Coordinates: 51.788051°N 8.672055°W

History
- Original company: Cork and Bandon Railway
- Pre-grouping: Cork, Bandon and South Coast Railway
- Post-grouping: Great Southern Railways

Key dates
- 1 August 1849: Station opens
- 1 April 1961: Station closes
Location

Upton and Innishannon railway station was on the Cork and Bandon Railway in County Cork, Ireland.

== History ==
Located near the village of Upton, the station opened as Brinney on 1 August 1849. It was renamed Upton and Brinney on 1 November 1851. It was further renamed Upton on 1 July 1883, and Upton and Innishannon from 1 July 1894.

It was the scene of the Upton Train Ambush on 15 February 1921 when the Irish Republican Army mounted an attack on a train carrying British soldiers. The action was a disaster for the IRA; three of its volunteers were killed and two wounded. Six British soldiers were wounded, three seriously. At least six civilian passengers were killed and ten wounded in the crossfire.

Regular passenger services were withdrawn on 1 April 1961.

== Routes ==
| Preceding station | Disused railways | Following station |
|---|---|---|
| Junction | Cork and Bandon Railway; Cork-Bandon | Bandon |
