= Aughaville railway station =

Former railway station in Ireland

Aughaville

General information
- Location: Aghaville, County Cork; Ireland
- Coordinates: 51.6547°N 9.3533°W
- Elevation: 172 ft (52 m)
- Platforms: 1
- Tracks: 1

Construction
- Structure type: Corrugated iron waiting room and gate keepers house, both extant

History
- Opened: 1 July 1881
- Closed: 31 March 1961
- Original company: Cork and Bandon Railway
- Pre-grouping: Great Southern and Western Railway
- Post-grouping: Great Southern Railways

Services
Preceding station	Disused railways	Following station
Drimoleague	Cork, Bandon and South Coast Railway (Bantry Extension Railway); Great Southern and Western Railway	Durrus Road
Location

Aughaville railway station, also called Aghaville, served the townland of Aghaville in County Cork, Ireland.

The station opened in 1881. Passenger services were withdrawn in 1961 by CIÉ.

== History ==
Opened by the Cork and Bandon (Bantry Extension) Railway, by the beginning of the 20th century the station was run by the Great Southern and Western Railway. It was absorbed into the Great Southern Railways in 1925.

The station was then nationalised, passing on to the Córas Iompair Éireann as a result of the Transport Act 1944 which took effect from 1 January 1945. It was closed by this management.
