= Ballymartle railway station =

Railway station in Ireland

Coordinates: 51.7765°N 8.5709°W

Ballymartle

General information
- Location: Ballymartle, County Cork; Ireland

History
- Opened: 1 April 1864
- Closed: 31 August 1931
- Original company: Cork and Kinsale Junction Railway
- Pre-grouping: Cork, Bandon and South Coast Railway
- Post-grouping: Great Southern Railways

Services
Preceding station	Cork and Kinsale Junction Railway	Following station
Junction	Junction-Kinsale	Farrangalway
Location

Ballymartle railway station was on the Cork and Kinsale Junction Railway in County Cork, Ireland.

== History ==
The station opened on 1 April 1864.

Regular passenger services were withdrawn on 31 August 1931.
