= Desert railway station =

Railway station in County Cork, Ireland

Coordinates: 51.7338°N 8.8969°W

Desert

General information
- Location: Desertserges, County Cork; Ireland

History
- Original company: West Cork Railway
- Pre-grouping: Cork, Bandon and South Coast Railway
- Post-grouping: Great Southern Railways

Key dates
- 12 June 1866: Station opens
- 1 April 1961: Station closes
Location
- Location within County Cork Location within Ireland

Desert railway station was on the West Cork Railway in County Cork, Ireland.

== History ==
The station opened on 12 June 1866.

Regular passenger services were withdrawn on 1 April 1961.

== Routes ==
Preceding station	Disused railways	Following station
Clonakilty Junction	West Cork Railway; Bandon-Dunmanway	Ballineen and Enniskean
