= Bandon West railway station =

Former railway station in Ireland

Bandon West

General information
- Location: Bandon, County Cork, County Cork; Ireland

History
- Opened: 12 June 1866
- Closed: 1 January 1880
- Original company: West Cork Railway
- Pre-grouping: Cork, Bandon and South Coast Railway
- Post-grouping: Great Southern Railways

Services
Preceding station	West Cork Railway	Following station
Bandon	Bandon-Dunmanway	Castle Bernard

Bandon West railway station was on the West Cork Railway in County Cork, Ireland.

== History ==
The station opened on 12 June 1866. It was moved and rebuilt on 1 June 1874.

Regular passenger services were withdrawn on 1 January 1880.
