= Waterfall railway station (Ireland) =

Irish railway station

Waterfall

General information
- Location: Waterfall, County Cork; Ireland
- Coordinates: 51.8553°N 8.5565°W

History
- Original company: Cork and Bandon Railway
- Pre-grouping: Cork, Bandon and South Coast Railway
- Post-grouping: Great Southern Railways

Key dates
- 12 June 1851: Station opens
- 1 April 1961: Station closes
Location

Waterfall railway station was on the Cork and Bandon Railway in County Cork, Ireland.

== History ==
The station opened on 12 June 1851. Regular passenger services were withdrawn on 1 April 1961.

== Routes ==
Preceding station	Disused railways	Following station
Cork Albert Quay	Cork and Bandon Railway; Cork-Bandon	Ballinhassig
