= Durrus Road railway station =

Railway station in Ireland

Durrus Road

General information
- Location: County Cork; Ireland

History
- Original company: Cork and Bandon Railway
- Pre-grouping: Cork, Bandon and South Coast Railway
- Post-grouping: Great Southern Railways

Key dates
- 4 July 1881: Station opens
- 1 April 1961: Station closes
Location

Durrus Road railway station was on the Cork and Bandon Railway in County Cork, Ireland.

== History ==
The station opened on 4 July 1881.

Regular passenger services were withdrawn on 1 April 1961.

== Routes ==
Preceding station	Disused railways	Following station
Aughaville	Cork and Bandon Railway; Drimoleague-Bantry 1881-1892	Bantry
Aughaville	Cork and Bandon Railway; Drimoleague-Bantry 1892-1961	Bantry Town
