= Ballinascarthy railway station =

Former railway station in Ireland

Coordinates: 51.6732°N 8.8580°W

Ballinascarthy

General information
- Location: Ballinascarthy, County Cork; Ireland

History
- Opened: 1 November 1886
- Closed: 1 April 1961
- Original company: Clonakilty Extension Railway
- Pre-grouping: Cork, Bandon and South Coast Railway
- Post-grouping: Great Southern Railways

Services
Preceding station	Disused railways	Following station
Clonakilty Junction	Clonakilty Extension Railway; Clonakilty Junction-Clonakilty	Clonakilty
Terminus	Ballinascarthy and Timoleague Junction Light Railway; Ballinascarthy-Timoleague	Skeaf
Location
- Location within County Cork Location within Ireland

Ballinascarthy railway station was on the Clonakilty Extension Railway in County Cork, Ireland.

== History ==
The station opened on 1 November 1886.

Regular passenger services were withdrawn on 1 April 1961.
