= Madore =

Madore is a surname. Notable people with the surname include:

- Elliot Madore (born 1987), Canadian lyric baritone
- Hervé Madore, French slalom canoeist
- Joseph Alexandre Camille Madore (1858–1906), Canadian politician
- Nelson Madore, American politician
- Shelley Madore, American politician
- Mitch Madore, Canadian Savant

== See also ==
- Madore railway station, a railway station in County Cork, Ireland
