= Bantry Pier railway station =

Railway station in County Cork, Ireland

Coordinates: 51.6817°N 9.457°W

Bantry Pier

General information
- Location: Bantry, County Cork; Ireland

History
- Original company: Cork and Bandon Railway
- Pre-grouping: Cork, Bandon and South Coast Railway
- Post-grouping: Great Southern Railways

Key dates
- 1 January 1909: Station opens
- 1 March 1950: Station closes
Location

Bantry Pier railway station was on the Cork and Bandon Railway in County Cork, Ireland.

== History ==
The station opened on 1 January 1909.

Regular passenger services were withdrawn in 1936 and the station closed in 1950.

== Routes ==
Preceding station	Disused railways	Following station
Bantry Town	Cork, Bandon and South Coast Railway; Drimoleague-Bantry	Terminus
