= Creagh railway station =

Railway station in Ireland

Creagh

General information
- Location: Creagh, County Cork; Ireland
- Coordinates: 51.52543°N 9.32658°W

History
- Original company: Baltimore Extension Railway
- Pre-grouping: Cork, Bandon and South Coast Railway
- Post-grouping: Great Southern Railways

Key dates
- 2 May 1893: Station opens
- 1 April 1961: Station closes
Location

Creagh (BER) railway station was on the Baltimore Extension Railway in County Cork, Ireland.

== History ==
The station opened on 2 May 1893.

Regular passenger services were withdrawn on 1 April 1961.

== Routes ==
Preceding station	Disused railways	Following station
Skibbereen	Baltimore Extension Railway; Skibbereen-Baltimore	Baltimore
