= Ballineen and Enniskean railway station =

Railway station in Ireland

Ballineen and Enniskean

General information
- Location: Ballineen and Enniskean, County Cork; Ireland
- Coordinates: 51.7355°N 8.9413°W

History
- Opened: 1891
- Original company: West Cork Railway
- Pre-grouping: Cork, Bandon and South Coast Railway
- Post-grouping: Great Southern Railways

Key dates
- 12 June 1866: Two stations opened separately
- 15 May 1891: Stations merged
- 15 May 1961: Station closes

Services
Preceding station	West Cork Railway	Following station
Desert	Bandon-Dunmanway	Dunmanway
Location
- Location within County Cork Location within Ireland

Ballineen and Enniskean railway station was on the West Cork Railway and served the twin villages of Ballineen and Enniskean in County Cork, Ireland.

== History ==
Two stations, "Ballineen" and "Enniskean", were built 1 mile apart and opened on 12 June 1866. They were both closed and merged in May 1891 with a new station opening as "Ballineen & Enniskean" station. The combined Ballineen and Enniskean railway station was built, as a two-bay two-storey building, in Derrigra townland.

On a railway map, dating to 1906, the station is marked as "Ballyneen & Enniskeen". and on Ordnance Survey maps it is marked as "Ballineen & Enniskean Station".

The West Cork line closed in March 1961, and regular passenger services to the station were withdrawn from April 1961.
