= Ballineen and Enniskean =

Twin villages in County Cork, Ireland

Ballineen and Enniskean Béal Átha Fhínín / Inis Céin Ballineen and Enniskeane
- Twin village
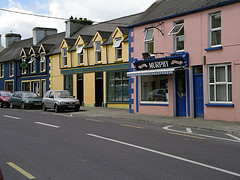
- Main Street Ballineen

- Location in Ireland
- Coordinates: 51°44′8″N 8°56′55″W
- Country: Ireland
- Province: Munster
- County: County Cork

Population (2022)
  - Total: 766
- Time zone: UTC+0 (WET)
  - Summer (DST): UTC-1 (IST (WEST))

The twin villages of Ballineen (Irish: Béal Átha Fhínín, meaning 'mouth of Fineen's ford') and Enniskeane, or Enniskean, (Irish: Inis Céin, meaning 'island of Cian') in County Cork in Ireland are 38 km (24 mi) southwest of Cork city, on the R586 road. The linear settlement lies on the River Bandon between Bandon and Dunmanway. The combined settlement is designated as a 'key village' by Cork County Council for planning purposes and, as of the 2022 census, had a population of 766 people.

== Etymology ==
Ballineen derives its name from the Irish, Béal Átha Fhínín, meaning 'mouth of Fineen's ford'.

Enniskean derives its name from the Irish, Inis Céin, meaning 'island of Cian'. It takes this name from Cian Maol Muadh, a member of the O'Mahony family and local chieftain. Cian married Sábh, the daughter of the High King of Ireland Brian Boru, and resided at Castlelands, Enniskean. The priest and antiquarian John O'Mahony, born locally in 1844, noted that the "Irish-speaking people of that district always pronounced the word as if written in English, 'Inniskayn'". Other Anglicised spelling variations include Enniskeen (used, for example, in some twentieth century census records). Enniskeane is commonly used in the name of the Roman Catholic parish, in the name of the local camogie club and routinely in Cork County Council publications.

The combined census town has been labelled by the Central Statistics Office (CSO) as Ballineen/Enniskean and Ballineen-Enniskean.

== History ==
Ballineen belonged first to the Earls of Cork and later to the Earls of Bandon. Francis Bernard, 3rd Earl of Bandon improved the village in the mid-19th century by building a market house, courthouse, Wesleyan Chapel, Gothic church and two schools in the area. Ballineen held monthly fairs until the mid-1960s.

Samuel Lewis wrote in his A Topographical Dictionary of Ireland, published in 1837, that the village of Inniskeen or Enniskeen was sacked by rebels in the Irish Rebellion of 1641. In 1690, during the Williamite War in Ireland, it was threatened by one of the leaders of the army of James II. The following year it was sacked by 1,500 Irish rebels, who set fire to it, and every house was destroyed except the houses occupied by the garrison, consisting of 44 men. The garrison held out until reinforcements arrived from Bandon that surprised the rebels, and 72 of them were killed in the pursuit. In the same year, 1691, it was fortified by Governor Cox, who placed a garrison of militia in the village.

The Church of the Immaculate Conception, in the parish of Enniskeane and Desertserges, of the Roman Catholic Diocese of Cork and Ross, was built in 1871. Father Daniel Coveney had persuaded the Duke of Devonshire to donate land for a new church. He donated £250 towards the costs of construction and gave 17 acres for the building of the church, a presbytery, stable, and grazing for the priest's horse.

Located about a half-mile apart, each village was served by separate train stations on the Cork, Bandon and South Coast Railway, which opened in 1866. These two separate train stations were closed and replaced with a combined station, Ballineen and Enniskean railway station, which opened in 1891. A number of businesses, including a flax mill, were built close to the station, on the road between the two villages, ultimately "joining" the two. Ballineen and Enniskean station closed in April 1961.

== Demographics ==
In the 30 years between the 1981 and the 2011 census, the population of the census town of Ballineen-Enniskean increased from 548 to 700 people. As of the 2022 census, it had a population of 766.

== Economy ==
The main employers in the area include a large Carbery Group cheese and ingredients factory approximately 2 km (1.24 mi) west of Ballineen on the R586 road, and Grainger's Sawmills in Enniskeane. The Grainger Group sawmill is one of the largest in Ireland, and the Carbery cheese plant at Ballineen is the "largest cheese-making facility" in Ireland and produces one quarter of all Irish-made cheese, including the Dubliner Cheese brand.

== Amenities ==
The villages have a Gaelic Athletic Association club called St. Mary's GAA club and a camogie club called Enniskeane Camogie Club. The clubs have previously undertaken joint fundraising activities.

The local association football (soccer) club, Riverside Athletic, plays its home games in Ballineen.

== People ==
- Fernand Auberjonois (1910–2004), Swiss-American journalist, had a cottage at Enniskeane
- John Caulfield (b.1964), American-born footballer and manager of Galway United F.C., played for St. Mary's GAA and lived in Enniskeane and Ballineen
- Fiona Everard (b.1998) Irish national champion runner, from Enniskeane
- Phil Healy (b.1994) Irish national sprinting champion, from Ballineen
- John O'Mahony (1844–1912), antiquarian and Roman Catholic priest from Enniskean
- Joe Walsh (1943–2014), politician and TD for Cork South-West, was born in Ballineen

== See also ==
- List of towns and villages in Ireland
- List of towns in Ireland/2002 Census Records
- Connagh, a nearby townland
