= Castle Bernard railway station =

Railway station in County Cork, Ireland

Coordinates: 51.7352°N 8.7543°W

Castle Bernard

General information
- Location: Castle Bernard, County Cork; Ireland

History
- Original company: West Cork Railway
- Pre-grouping: Cork, Bandon and South Coast Railway
- Post-grouping: Great Southern Railways

Key dates
- 12 June 1866: Station opens
- 1 April 1891: Station closes
Location
- Location within County Cork Location within Ireland

Castle Bernard railway station was on the West Cork Railway in County Cork, Ireland.

== History ==
The station opened on 12 June 1866 as a private station for The 3rd Earl of Bandon who lived at Castle Bernard, a country house near Bandon. It was opened to public services from 1 February 1874.

Regular passenger services were withdrawn on 1 April 1891.

== Routes ==
Preceding station	Disused railways	Following station
Bandon West	West Cork Railway; Bandon-Dunmanway	Clonakilty Junction
