= CBSCR Bandon Tank =

Class of steam locomotives

CB&SCR 4-6-0T GSR Class 463 (B4)
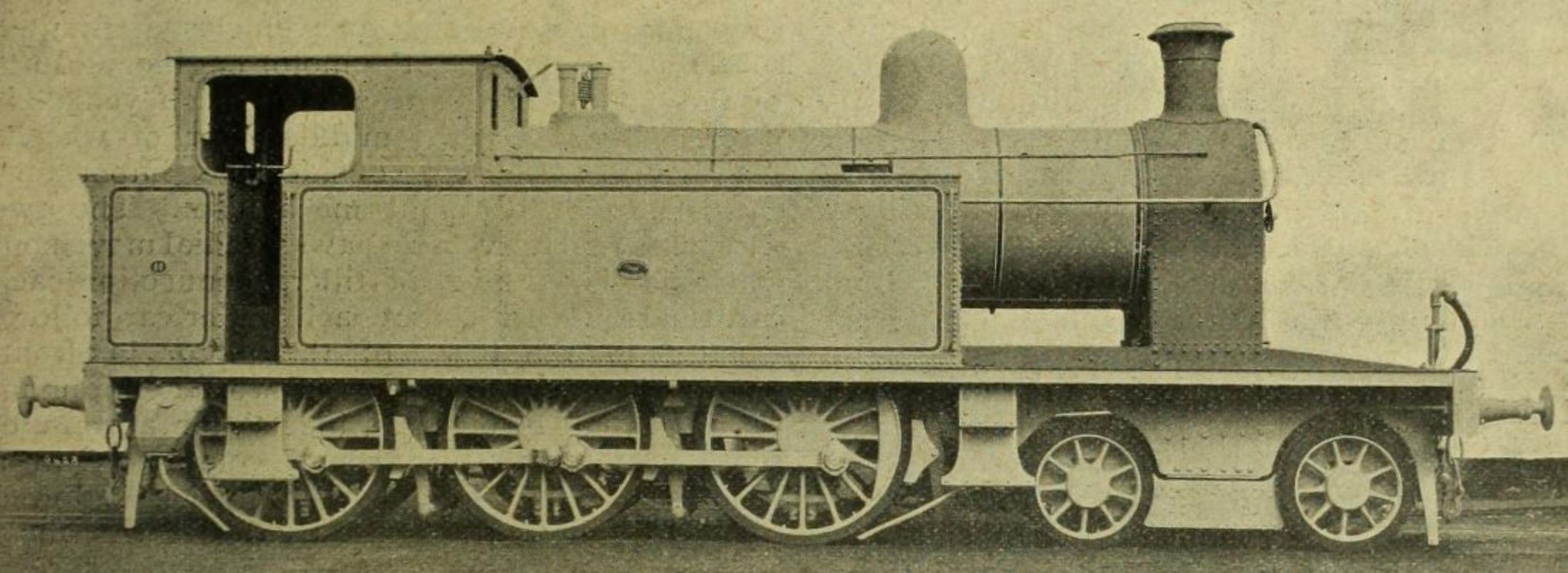
- Bandon tank
Type and origin
- Power type: Steam
- Builder: Beyer, Peacock & Company
- Serial number: 4752, 5265, 5413, 5616, 5822, 5954, 6034, 6077
- Build date: 1906–1920
- Total produced: 8
- Rebuild date: 1935–1950
- Number rebuilt: 5
Specifications
- Configuration
  - Whyte: 4-6-0T
  - UIC: 2′C n2t
- Gauge: 5 ft 3 in (1,600 mm)
- Leading dia.: 3 ft 0 in (914 mm)
- Driver dia.: 5 ft 2 1/2 in (1,588 mm)
- Length: 36 ft 6 1/2 in (11,138 mm)
- Axle load: 14 long tons 5 cwt (31,900 lb or 14.5 t)
- Adhesive weight: 42 long tons 1 cwt (94,200 lb or 42.7 t)
- Loco weight: 56 long tons 10 cwt (126,600 lb or 57.4 t)
- Fuel capacity: 2 long tons 15 cwt (6,200 lb or 2.8 t)
- Water cap.: 1,100 imp gal (5,000 L; 1,300 US gal)
- Firebox
  - Grate area: 24 sq ft (2.2 m^{2})
- Boiler pressure: 160 psi (1.10 MPa)
- Heating surface
  - Firebox: 107.5 sq ft (9.99 m^{2})
  - Tubes: 1,182.5 sq ft (109.86 m^{2})
- Cylinders: Two
- Cylinder size: 18 in × 24 in (457 mm × 610 mm)
Performance figures
- Tractive effort: 16,030 lbf (71.30 kN)
Career
- Operators: Cork, Bandon & South Coast Railway; → Great Southern Railways; → CIÉ
- Class: GSR/CIÉ: 463; Inchicore: B4
- Numbers: GSR/CIÉ: 463–470
- Nicknames: Bandon Tanks
- Withdrawn: 1945–1963
- Disposition: All scrapped

The CBSCR Bandon Tanks were a class of 4-6-0T mixed-traffic locomotives built for the Cork, Bandon & South Coast Railway (CB&SCR) between 1906 and 1920. The Bandon Tanks were the only 4-6-0 tank locomotives to be built by Beyer, Peacock & Company. The class went on to serve with the CB&SCR's successors: the Great Southern Railways from 1925 and CIÉ from 1945.

The Bandon Tanks excelled due to their elegant design, high power output and compact wheel arrangement, which suited the track of the CB&SCR network.

== Introduction and CB&SCR service ==
The 4-6-0T wheel arrangement was more typically found on narrow gauge lines, because the restricted bunker space (and resultant limited coal capacity) is less of a hindrance on the typically shorter journeys of such lines. A 4-6-2T wheel arrangement would have given more bunker space, but it would have been too long for the CB&SCR's turntables. The wheelbase was also short-coupled (close to each other) in order to manage the tight curves on the CB&SCR lines. Each locomotive had capacity for two tons of coal and 1,100 gallons of water and weighed 56 tons 10 hundredweight.

The first member of the class was 11 which was ordered in 1905, cost £3,145 and was delivered in June 1906. The next to be built was 14, which was ordered in 1908, cost £2,575 and was delivered in March 1909. These were followed by 15 in October 1910, 20 in July 1912 and 19 in June 1914.

The CB&SCR ordered no. 4 in April 1915 but World War I restrictions prevented Beyer, Peacock from completing and delivering it until October 1919. The two final members of the class were 8 and 13, which were delivered in November 1920. Post-war inflation had trebled the price of these final two locomotives to £8,163 and £9,163 respectively.

Operationally the Bandon Tanks were small and powerful locomotives, well regarded apart from the cramped cab and the difficulty of cab access due to the rear wheel splashers. Despite the bunker size being limited by the 4-6-0T layout, Bandon Tanks had no difficulty covering distances on the CB&SCR network, the greatest of which was 62 miles (100 km) between Cork Albert Quay and Baltimore.

== GSR and CIÉ service and withdrawal ==
The GSR renumbered the class 463 – 470 and later designated it Class B4. Between 1935 and 1947 the GSR rebuilt five of the class with type "R" Belpaire superheated boilers.

The majority of the class continued to work on the former CB&SC network, but in 1929 the GSR transferred 468 to Grand Canal Street depot in Dublin for suburban service on the former Dublin & South Eastern Railway main line between Dublin Westland Row and Bray. In 1939 first 470 and then 466 were also transferred to Grand Canal Street. 469 replaced 466 on the Bray line for just over a year, from 1941 until 1942. 466 became the last Bandon Tank in service on the Bray line, remaining there until September 1956.

465 and 469 were withdrawn in 1945. CIÉ withdrew 467 in 1959. CIÉ withdrew 466, 468 and 470 in 1961, the year that it closed the former CB&SCR network. 463 and 464 stayed in service until 1963, which was CIÉ's final year of steam traction.

== Livery ==
In CB&SCR service the class was painted olive green with yellow lining. Throughout the period of Great Southern Railways operation (1925-45), along with all locomotives on the West Cork system (and further afield), they were all-over unlined dark grey, which was carried over into CIE days. In CIÉ service there was some variation in liveries.

- 466 was painted lined CIÉ green in December 1948.
- 467 was a dark blue-green in 1953.
- 470 was a dark matt off-black (likely to be a local variation of the standard dark grey livery) in 1954 and 463 was the same in 1962.
- 464 appeared to be gloss black in 1961.

Any others remained dark grey.

== Model ==
A 1:76 scale (OO and 21 mm gauges) nickel-silver kit is available from Studio Scale Models. Both Belpaire and unsaturated versions can be made.

== Bibliography ==
- Boocock, Colin (2009). Locomotive Compendium: Ireland. Shepperton: Ian Allan Publishing. ISBN 978-0-7110-3360-3.
- Clements, Jeremy & McMahon, Michael (2008). Locomotives of the GSR. Newtownards: Colourpoint Books. pp. 162–163. ISBN 978-1-906578-26-8.
- Ferris, Tom (1995). Irish Railways in Colour: A Second Glance, 1947–70. Hinckley: Midland Publishing. ISBN 1857800192.
- Patience, Jack (2006). CIÉ 1958 to 1962. Irish Railway Photographers. Newtownards: Colourpoint Books. ISBN 1904242693.
- Shepherd, Ernie (2005). Cork, Bandon & South Coast Railway. Hinckley: Midland Publishing. ISBN 1-85780-198-9.
