= Waterfall, County Cork =

Village in County Cork, Ireland

Waterfall Tobar an Iarla
- Village
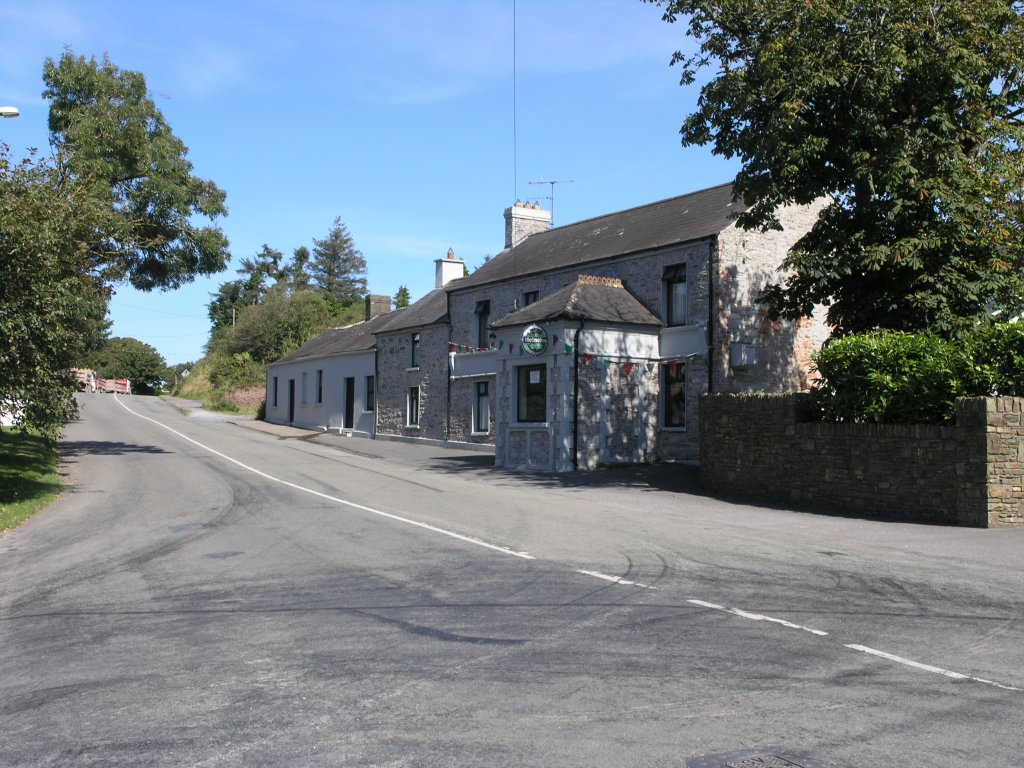
- O'Shea's pub in Waterfall

- Location in Ireland
- Coordinates: 51°51′16.15″N 08°33′16.58″W
- Country: Ireland
- Province: Munster
- County: County Cork
- Time zone: UTC+0 (WET)
  - Summer (DST): UTC-1 (IST (WEST))

Waterfall (Irish: Tobar an Iarla, meaning 'well of the earl') is a small village in County Cork, Ireland. It is located just south of Cork city in the parish of Ballinora. It lies on the L2230 road, connecting Crossbarry to the city. There is a pub on the Crossbarry side of the village. The local Gaelic Athletic Association team is Ballinora GAA club.

The West Cork Railway once served the area, and Waterfall railway station operated from 1851 to 1961. A railway bridge, built c. 1850, is still in place on the road leading to Ballinora.

== See also ==
- List of towns and villages in Ireland
