= Connagh =

Connagh Irish: Conach
- Townland
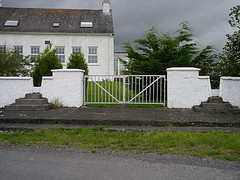
- Former Connagh National School building

- Connagh shown within Ireland
- Coordinates: 51°45′12″N 08°59′47″W
- Country: Ireland
- County: County Cork
- Barony: Carbery East (W.D.)
- Civil parish: Kinneigh

Area
  - Total: 125 ha (309 acres)

Connagh (Irish: Conach) is a rural townland in the historical barony of East Carbery (West Division) in County Cork, Ireland. It is near the village of Ballineen. As of the 2011 census, there were 28 people living in the townland, of which 14 were male and 14 female. The total housing stock was 12, of which one house was vacant.

Connagh was previously home to a national (primary) school.

Archaeological sites in the townland include a ringfort with a souterrain.

== See also ==
- List of townlands of the Barony of East Carbery (West_Division)
