= Drimoleague railway station =

Station in County Cork, Ireland

Drimoleague
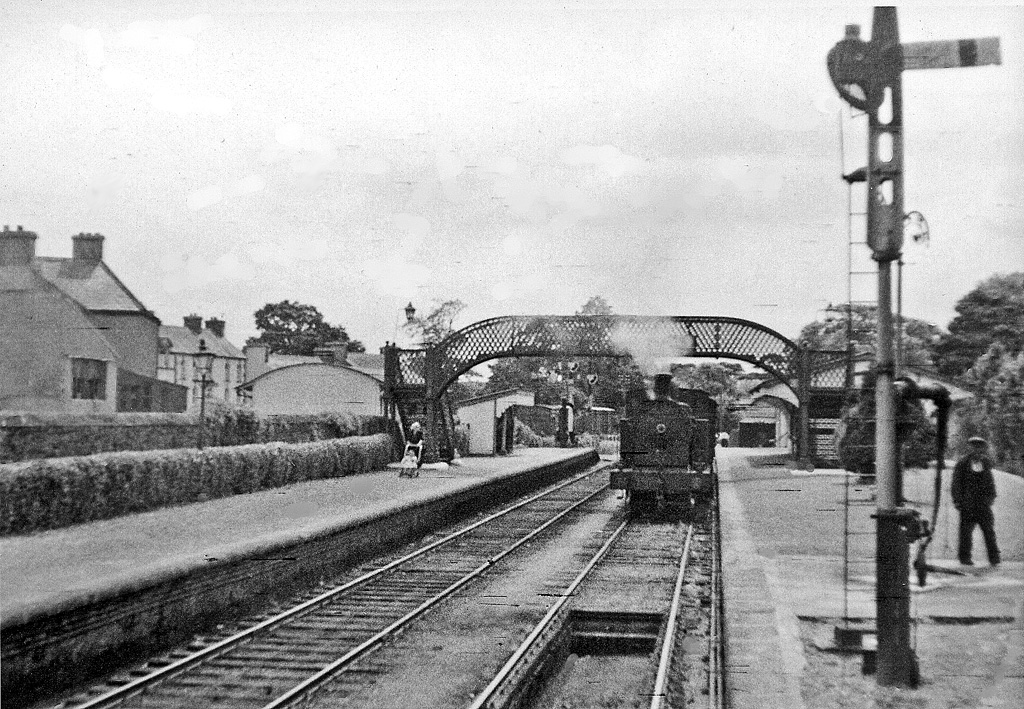
- Drimoleague Junction Station View eastwards, towards Bandon and Cork; ex-Cork, Bandon & South Coast Railway. Photograph taken on 20 July 1955.

General information
- Location: Drimoleague, County Cork; Ireland
- Coordinates: 51.6603709°N 9.2614565°W

History
- Original company: Ilen Valley Railway
- Pre-grouping: Cork, Bandon and South Coast Railway
- Post-grouping: Great Southern Railways

Key dates
- 23 July 1877: Station opens
- 1 April 1961: Station closes
Location

Drimoleague railway station was on the Ilen Valley Railway in County Cork, Ireland. It was in the village of Drimoleague.

== History ==
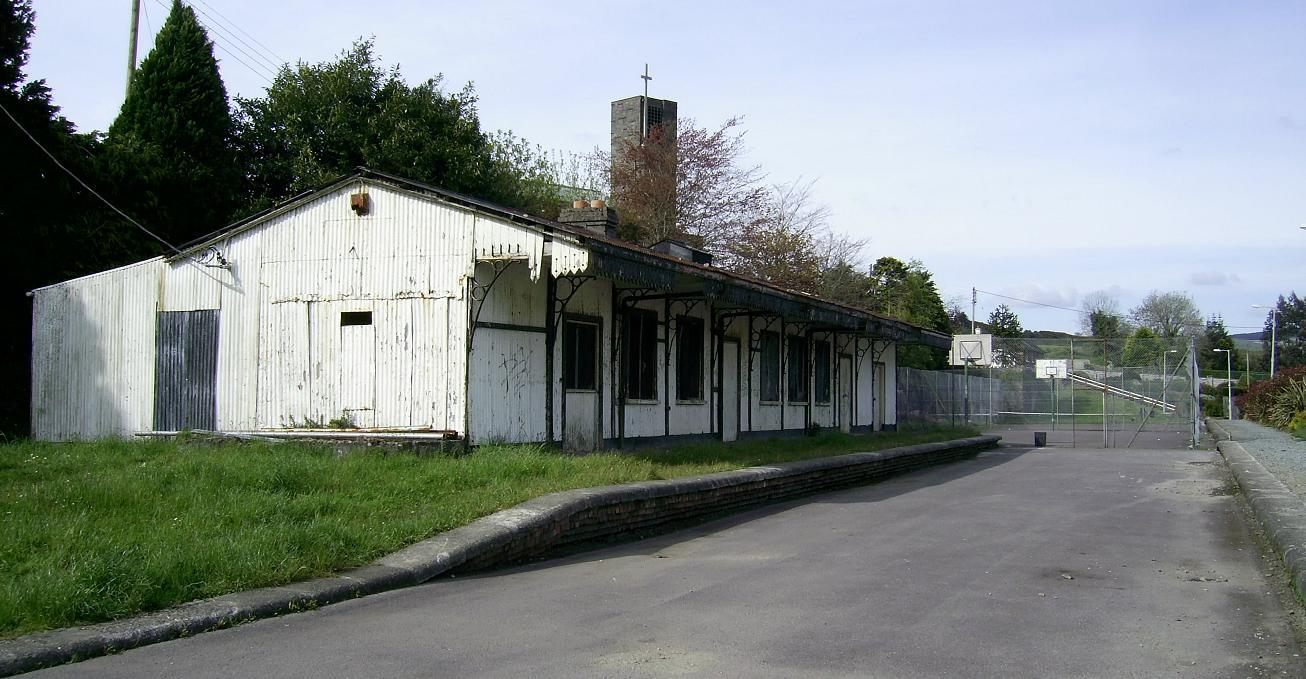
Surviving station building and platforms as at 2005

The station opened on 23 July 1877.

Regular passenger services were withdrawn on 1 April 1961. As of 2024, the station building and the platforms remain, but there has been miscellaneous development on other parts of the station.

== Routes ==
Preceding station	Disused railways	Following station
Dunmanway	Ilen Valley Railway; Dunmanaway-Skibbereen	Madore
Terminus	Cork and Bandon Railway; Drimoleague-Bantry	Aughaville
