= Bantry railway station =

Railway station in County Cork, Ireland

Bantry

General information
- Location: Bantry, County Cork; Ireland

History
- Original company: Cork and Bandon Railway
- Pre-grouping: Cork, Bandon and South Coast Railway
- Post-grouping: Great Southern Railways

Key dates
- 4 July 1881: Station opens
- 22 October 1892: Station closes

Bantry railway station was on the Cork and Bandon Railway in County Cork, Ireland.

== History ==
The station opened on 4 July 1881.

On 7 July 1887, an early morning mail train crashed through the buffers, killing the driver and seriously injuring the fireman. The enquiry concluded that the driver had been speeding.

Regular passenger services were withdrawn on 22 October 1892 when a new station, Bantry Town, was opened closer to the town centre.

== Routes ==
Preceding station	Disused railways	Following station
Durrus Road	Cork and Bandon Railway; Drimoleague-Bantry	Terminus
