= Dunmanway railway station =

Railway station in Ireland

Dunmanway
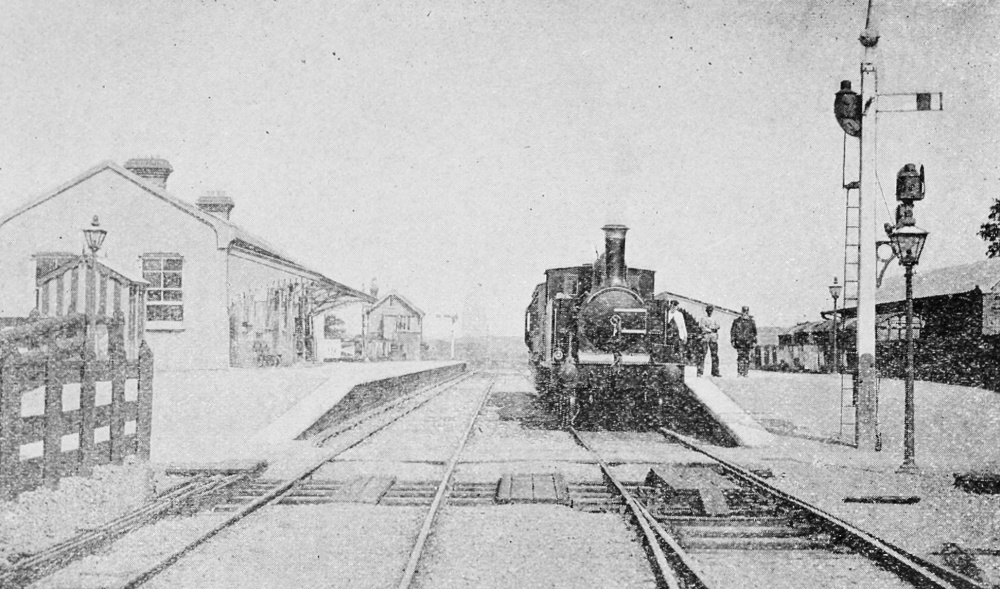
- Dunmanway station c. 1898

General information
- Location: Dunmanway, County Cork; Ireland

History
- Original company: West Cork Railway
- Pre-grouping: Cork, Bandon and South Coast Railway
- Post-grouping: Great Southern Railways

Key dates
- 12 June 1866: Station opens
- 1 April 1961: Station closes
Location

Dunmanway railway station was on the West Cork Railway, Dunmanway, in County Cork, Ireland. It was located at the southern end of the town, near to the junction of Park Road and Clonakilty Road.

An adjacent hotel (still in existence today under another name) was known as the 'Railway Hotel'.

== History ==
The station opened on 12 June 1866.

Regular passenger services were withdrawn on 1 April 1961.

== Routes ==
Preceding station	Disused railways	Following station
Ballineen and Enniskean	West Cork Railway; Bandon-Dunmanway	Terminus
Terminus	Ilen Valley Railway; Dunmanway-Skibbereen	Drimoleague
