= CBSCR Baldwin saddle tank =

Former steam locomotive class

CB&SCR Baldwin saddle tank
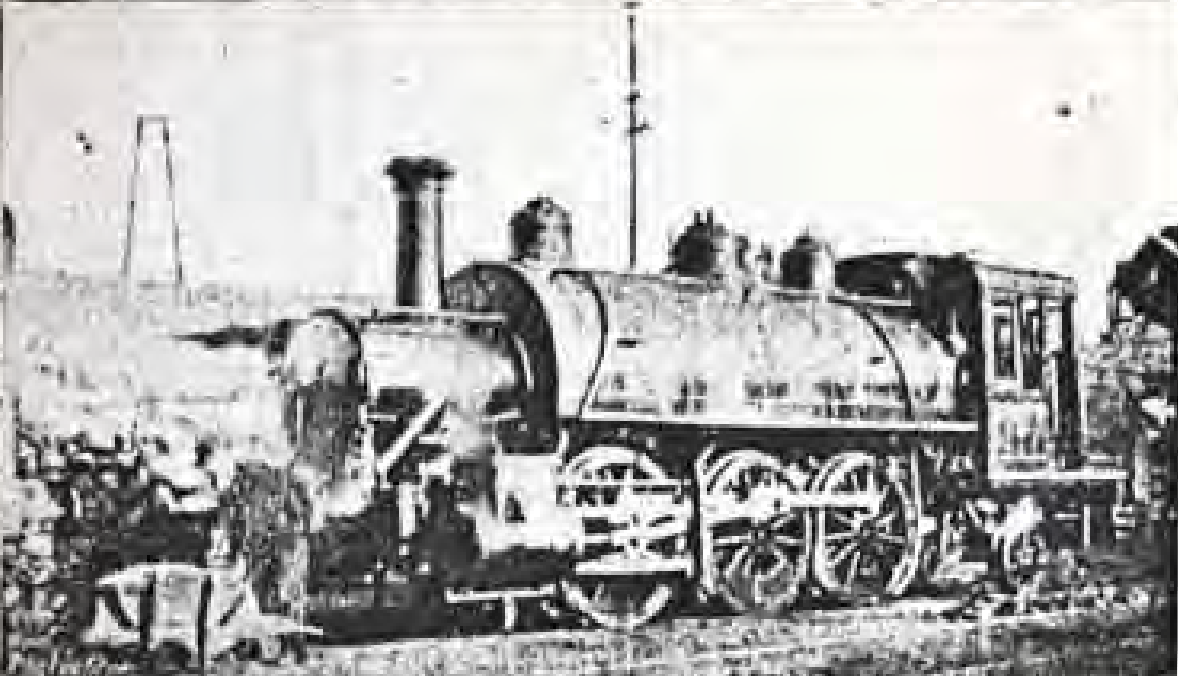
Type and origin
- Power type: Steam
- Builder: Burnam & Williams
- Serial number: 18027–8
- Build date: 1900; 126 years ago
- Total produced: 2
Specifications
- Configuration
  - Whyte: 0-6-2ST
- Gauge: 5 ft 3 in (1,600 mm)
- Driver dia.: 4 ft 8 in (1,422 mm)
- Loco weight: 40 long tons 09 cwt (90,600 lb or 41.1 t)
- Fuel type: Coal
- Boiler pressure: 160 psi (1.10 MPa)
- Heating surface: 1,179.7 sq ft (109.60 m^{2})
- Cylinders: Two
- Cylinder size: 18 in × 24 in (457 mm × 610 mm)
Career
- Operators: Cork, Bandon and South Coast Railway
- Number in class: 2
- Numbers: 19, 20
- Withdrawn: 1912 (20), sometime after 1914 (19)
- Disposition: Both scrapped

The CB&SCR Baldwin saddle tank was a class of two of 0-6-2ST locomotives purchased by the Cork, Bandon and South Coast Railway (CB&SCR), being the first purchase of locomotives for Ireland from America. (Note: According to Rowledge's 1993 register these were the only steam locomotives built in America for Ireland; it seems probable the next supply from America were the CIÉ 121 Class diesels in 1961) They were not very successful, with a service life of 14 years or less.

== History ==
In January 1900, supply from British builders proved expensive, with quotes between £3,000 and £3,600 in the context of a time of high demand and strikes, so the CB&SCR accepted an offer to supply two goods locomotives at a cost of £2,575 from Burnham Williams & Co (Baldwins), the first purchase of a locomotive for Ireland from America. The first was under trial by October, but there were problems with its heavy weight and weak frames, and a compensation of £100 from Baldwin was accepted. The railway decided to alter the brake blocks, which all applied to the front of each driving wheel, so that the last pair had the blocks applied on the rear. Other alterations included replacing "annoying" whistles, open footsteps with "standard" Bandon ones, and the relocation of sandboxes from the saddle tank. A. J. Chisholm, writing in the Railway Magazine said he had observed No. 19 of them shunting in Cork and described it as an "ungainly looking machine" and terming it a "Yankee".

By 1908, chief engineer Johnstone (junior) doubted the locomotives would last four more years, No. 20 being sold for scrap in 1912, while No. 19 was noted in traffic hauling a special goods in 1914. Shepherd remarks, "whilst the purchase of these engines was regarded as a necessity at the time, they proved to be a poor bargain."
