= TCLR Argadeen =

Class of 1 Irish 2-6-0T locomotive

Timoleague and Courtmacsherry Light Railway Argadeen
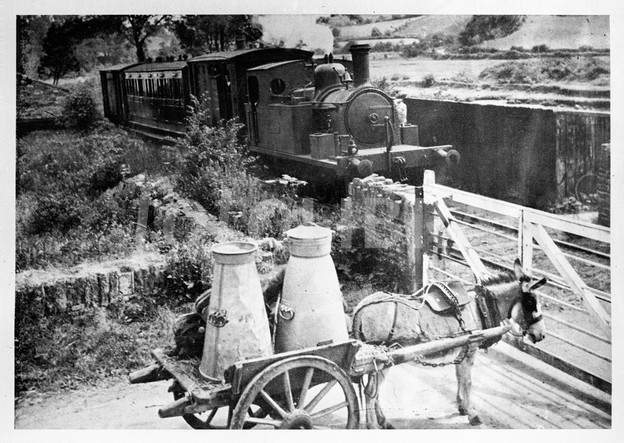
- 2-6-0T locomotive 'Argadeen' with Courtmacsherry train entering Timoleague Station in the 1910s
Type and origin
- Power type: Steam
- Builder: Hunslet
- Serial number: 611
- Build date: 1894
- Total produced: 1
- Rebuild date: 1929
Specifications
- Configuration
  - Whyte: 2-6-0T
- Gauge: 1,600 mm (5 ft 3 in)
- Driver dia.: 3 ft 6 in (1,067 mm)
- Wheelbase: 9 ft 0 in (2.74 m)
- Loco weight: 28 long tons 0 cwt (62,700 lb or 28.4 t)
- Boiler pressure: 145 psi (1.00 MPa)
- Cylinders: Two
- Cylinder size: 14 in × 18 in (356 mm × 457 mm)
Performance figures
- Tractive effort: 10,350 lbf (46.0 kN)
Career
- Operators: T&CLR » GSR » CIÉ
- Class: TCLR: none GSR: K5
- Number in class: Hunslet built 2 identical locomotives, 610, named Erin and 611 Argadeen. Erin stayed with contractors when Argadeen passed to the T&CLR
- Numbers: None
- Official name: Argadeen
- Withdrawn: 1957

The Timoleague and Courtmacsherry Light Railway, opened in April 1891, was originally operated by two locomotives, both from the Leeds works of the Hunslet Engine Company, named Slaney and St. Molaga. These two were joined by a third locomotive, again from Hunslet in 1894. This third locomotive carried the name Argadeen and under the classification adopted by the Great Southern Railways on amalgamation in 1925 became the sole representative of Class K5.

== History ==
When delivered in 1894, the locomotive, works number 611, was typical of a type used on unfenced lines, particularly in an area where livestock is reared and the horse and cart or even the packhorse the main mode of local goods transportation. The locomotive, built with a round-topped firebox and dome was also fitted with a bell, mounted on the boiler between the chimney and the dome. To aid its progress around the tight track work on the line it had a rigid wheelbase of just 9 ft (2.7 m) band the centre driving wheel was without flange. As part of the line ran alongside the road cowcatchers front and rear and side-skirts, to prevent the scaring of animals by the motion of the coupling rods and the seeping of steam from the cylinders, were also fitted. The locomotive was basically an 0-6-0 but the axle load was lightened by the addition of a leading truck and to accommodate this the frames and footplate were extended forward by a couple of feet or so. It was, to the eye, a Tram-type locomotive. In due time the side-skirting was removed, only the deep, almost enclosed cab steps and the fixing points giving a clue as to it ever being there.

The locomotive was subsequently rebuilt, the cab was enlarged and fitted with new steps, a Belpaire firebox and a flat-topped dome fitted.

The TCLR locomotives did not carry numbers, all were named, these being carried on cast plates fitted to the side tank. The makers plate was fitted to the coal bunker. Hunslet No. 611 was named Argadeen.

This locomotive, along with 0-4-2T St. Molaga, passed to the GSR on amalgamation in 1925. It was scrapped in 1957.

== Livery ==
Argadeen was originally black with cast brass makers plate raised letters against vermilion background. After the 1925 amalgamation, she received the standard GSR unlined grey livery which she wore for the rest of her days.
