= Clonakilty Junction railway station =

Railway station in Ireland

Clonakilty Junction
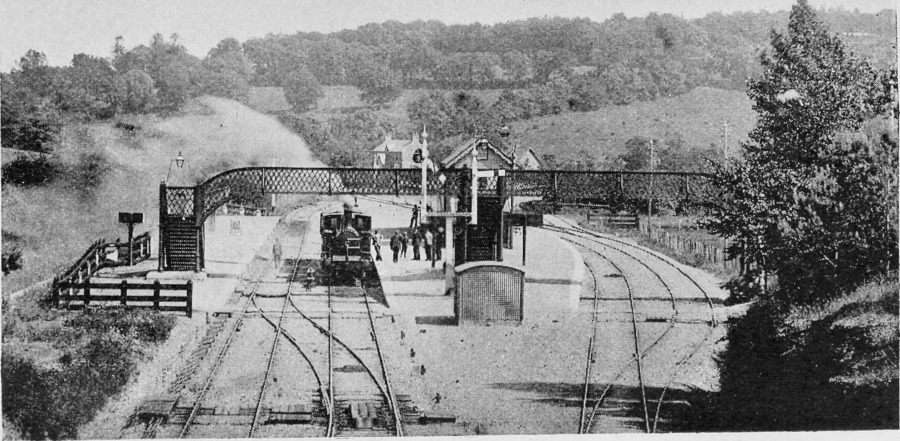
- Clonakilty Junction station c1898

General information
- Location: County Cork; Ireland

History
- Original company: West Cork Railway
- Pre-grouping: Cork, Bandon and South Coast Railway
- Post-grouping: Great Southern Railways

Key dates
- 12 June 1866: Station opens as Gaggin
- 1886: Station renamed Clonakilty Junction
- 1 April 1961: Station closes
Location

Clonakilty Junction railway station was on the West Cork Railway in County Cork, Ireland.

== History ==
The station opened on 12 June 1866.

Regular passenger services were withdrawn on 1 April 1961.

== Routes ==
Preceding station	Disused railways	Following station
Castle Bernard	West Cork Railway; Bandon-Dunmanway	Desert
Terminus	Clonakilty Extension Railway; Clonakilty Junction-Clonakilty	Ballinascarthy
