= Timoleague railway station =

Railway station in Ireland

Timoleague
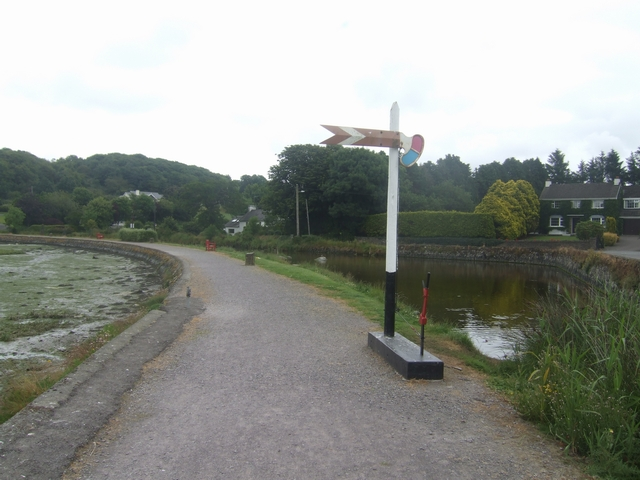
- Railway route in Timoleague

General information
- Location: Timoleague, County Cork; Ireland

History
- Original company: Ballinascarthy and Timoleague Junction Light Railway; Timoleague and Courtmacsherry Extension Light Railway
- Pre-grouping: Cork, Bandon and South Coast Railway
- Post-grouping: Great Southern Railways

Key dates
- 20 December 1890: Station opens
- 24 February 1947: Station closes
Location

Timoleague railway station was on the Ballinascarthy and Timoleague Railway and on the Timoleague and Courtmacsherry Railway. It was located in Timoleague, County Cork, Ireland.

== History ==
The station opened on 20 December 1890.

Passenger services were withdrawn on 24 February 1947.

== Routes ==
Preceding station	Disused railways	Following station
Skeaf	Ballinascarthy and Timoleague Junction Light Railway; Ballinascarthy-Timoleague	Terminus
Terminus	Timoleague and Courtmacsherry Extension Light Railway; Timoleague-Courtmacsherry	Courtmacsherry
