= Ballinascarty =

Village in County Cork, Ireland

Ballinascarthy Béal na Scairte
- Village
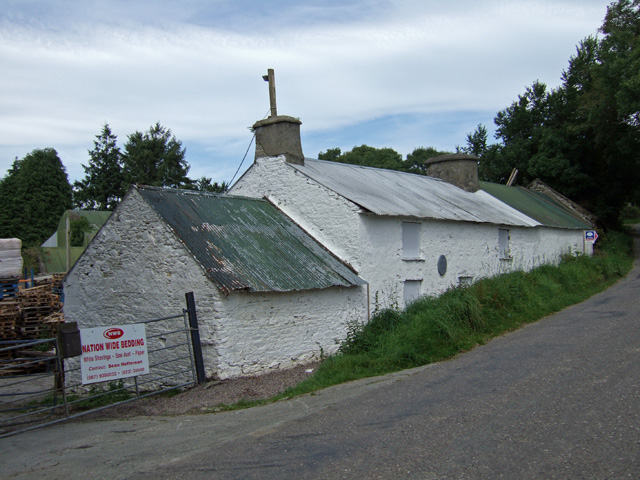
- The Bold Tenant Farmer's Cottage

- Location in Ireland
- Coordinates: 51°40′27″N 8°51′31″W
- Country: Ireland
- Province: Munster
- County: County Cork
- Time zone: UTC+0 (WET)
  - Summer (DST): UTC-1 (IST (WEST))

Ballinascarty (Irish: Béal na Scairte), also known as Ballinascarthy, is a village in County Cork, Ireland.

== Location ==
Ballinascarty lies in West Cork, approximately 7 km (4.35 mi) north-northeast of Clonakilty and 15 km south-west of Bandon, on the main N71 road from Clonakilty to Cork.

== Places of interest ==
Nearby is the Lisselan Estate, the gardens of which are open to the public. There is also a golf course. Henry Ford, the well-known machine manufacturer was of Irish descent. Henry Ford's father, William, and grandfather, John, were born in Ballinascarty before their emigration to Detroit, Michigan, United States. Henry Ford went on to be one of the most influential people in the automotive industry, inventing mass production and the Fordson model F tractor, which put many small-scale tractor manufacturers out of business. A memorial to Henry Ford was placed in the town in the shape of a Model T statue on 3 September 2000.

== Sport ==
Ballinascathy is home to Ballinascarthy GAA.

== People ==
- Teddy Holland, former Cork county Gaelic Football player
- John Ford, grandfather of Henry Ford

== See also ==
- List of towns and villages in Ireland
- Ballinascarthy railway station
