= Bantry Town railway station =

Railway station in Ireland

Bantry Town
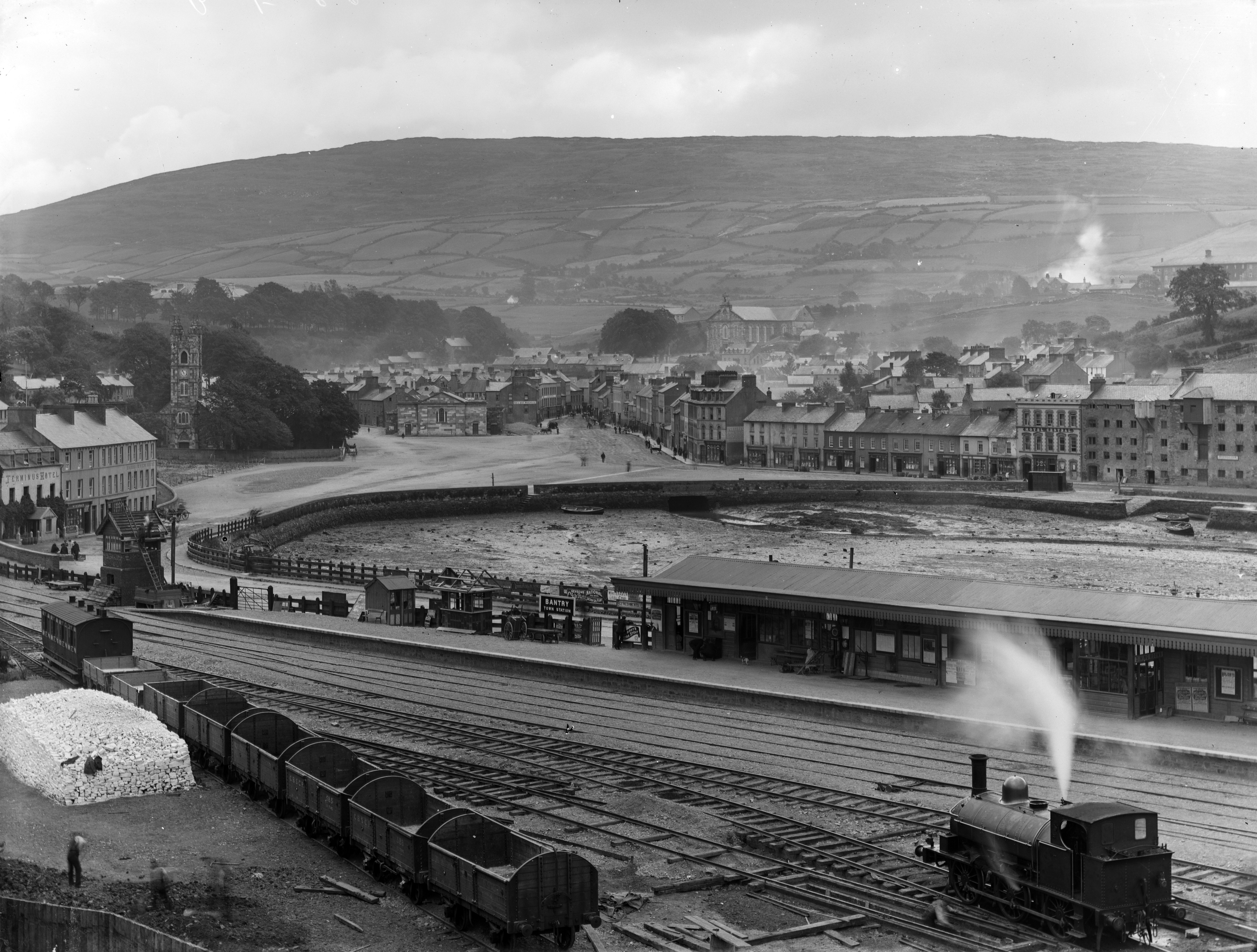
- Bantry Town station c1892

General information
- Location: Bantry, County Cork; Ireland
- Coordinates: 51.6815°N 9.4575°W

History
- Original company: Cork and Bandon Railway
- Pre-grouping: Cork, Bandon and South Coast Railway
- Post-grouping: Great Southern Railways

Key dates
- 22 October 1892: Station opens
- 1 April 1961: Station closes
Location

Bantry Town railway station was on the Cork and Bandon Railway in County Cork, Ireland.

== History ==
The station opened on 22 October 1892.

Regular passenger services were withdrawn on 1 April 1961.

== Routes ==
Preceding station	Disused railways	Following station
Durrus Road	Cork, Bandon and South Coast Railway; Drimoleague-Bantry	Bantry Pier

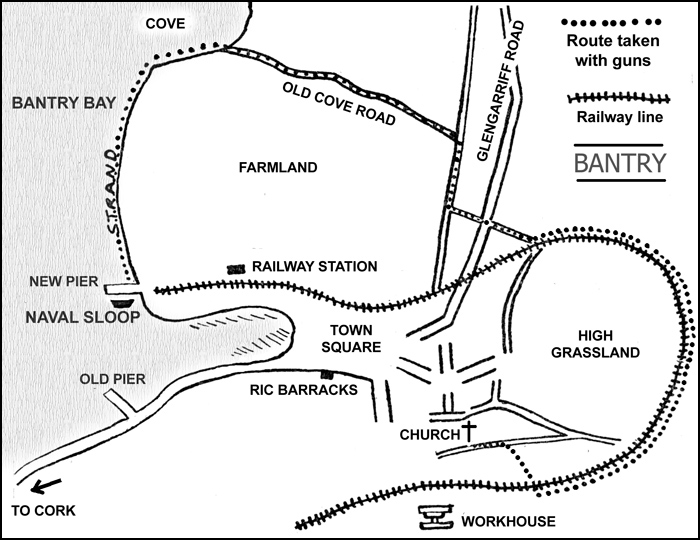
Bantry map of Railway Tracks
