= Madore railway station =

Railway station in Ireland

Madore

General information
- Location: Madore, County Cork; Ireland

History
- Original company: Ilen Valley Railway
- Pre-grouping: Cork, Bandon and South Coast Railway
- Post-grouping: Great Southern Railways

Key dates
- 1 March 1878: Station opens
- 1 April 1961: Station closes
Location

Madore railway station was on the Ilen Valley Railway in County Cork, Ireland.

== History ==
The station opened on 1 March 1878.

Regular passenger services were withdrawn on 1 April 1961.

== Routes ==
Preceding station	Disused railways	Following station
Drimoleague	Ilen Valley Railway; Dunmanaway-Skibbereen	Skibbereen
