= TCLR St. Molaga =

Class of 1 Irish 0-4-2T locomotive

Type and origin
- Power type: Steam
- Builder: Hunslet Engine Company
- Serial number: 520
- Build date: 1890
Specifications
- Configuration
  - Whyte: 0-4-2T
  - UIC: B1 n2t
- Gauge: 5 ft 3 in (1,600 mm)
- Driver dia.: 3 ft 3 in (0.991 m)
- Fuel type: Coal
- Cylinders: Two, outside
- Cylinder size: 10 1/2 in × 16 in (267 mm × 406 mm)
Career
- Operators: Timoleague and Courtmacsherry Light Railway; Great Southern Railways; Coras Iompair Eireann
- Class: GSR/CIÉ Inchicore class L6
- Withdrawn: 1949

The Timoleague and Courtmacsherry Light Railway, Ireland, opened in April 1891, was originally operated by two locomotives, both from the Leeds works of the Hunslet Engine Company. The first of these was an 0-6-0ST named Slaney, built in 1885 it did not survive to the 1925 amalgamation, being scrapped five years previously.

The second locomotive was Hunslet No.520, built in 1890, an 0-4-2T named St. Molaga, which under the classification adopted by the Great Southern Railways on amalgamation in 1925 became the sole representative of Class L6.

This locomotive, along with a third Hunslet, Argadeen, passed to the GSR on amalgamation in 1925. It passed to Córas Iompair Éireann at the 1945 nationalisation and was withdrawn in 1949.
