= Courtmacsherry railway station =

Railway station in County Cork, Ireland

Coordinates: 51.6355°N 8.7117°W

Courtmacsherry

General information
- Location: Courtmacsherry, County Cork; Ireland

History
- Original company: Timoleague and Courtmacsherry Extension Light Railway
- Pre-grouping: Cork, Bandon and South Coast Railway
- Post-grouping: Great Southern Railways

Key dates
- 23 April 1891: Station opens
- 24 February 1947: Station closes
Location
- Location within County Cork Location within Ireland

Courtmacsherry railway station was on the Timoleague and Courtmacsherry Extension Light Railway. It was located in Courtmacsherry, County Cork, Ireland.

== History ==
The station opened on 23 February 1891.

Passenger services were withdrawn on 24 February 1947.

== Routes ==
| Preceding station | Disused railways | Following station |
|---|---|---|
| Timoleague | Timoleague and Courtmacsherry Extension Light Railway; Timoleague-Courtmacsherry | Terminus |
