= Ballinora =

Townland in County Cork, Ireland

Ballinora Baile an Óraigh
- Townland
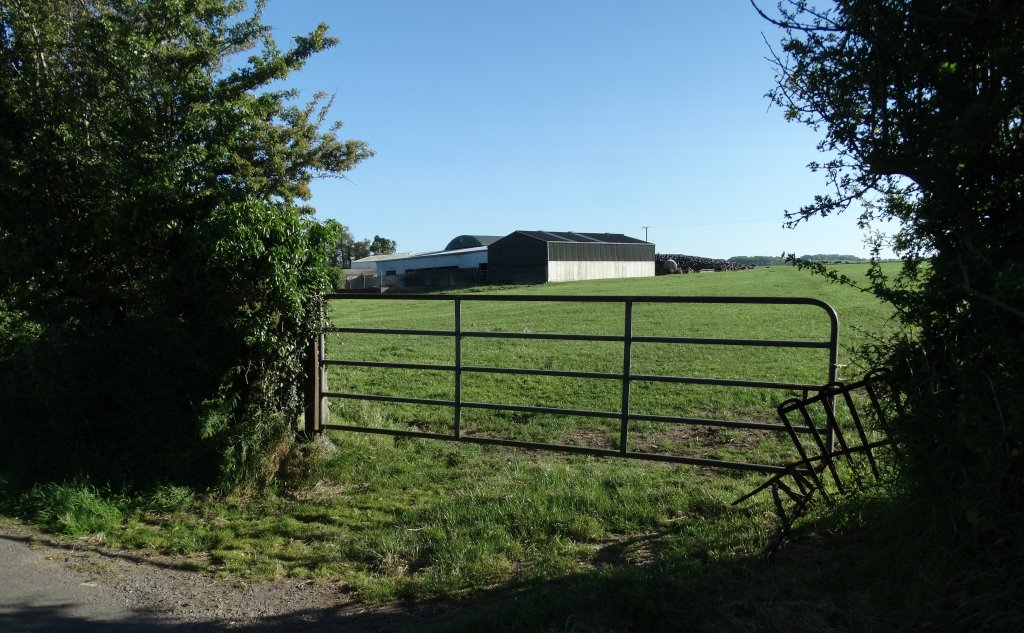
- Farm buildings in Ballinora townland

- Location in Ireland
- Coordinates: 51.8545°N 8.5653°W
- Country: Ireland
- Province: Munster
- County: County Cork

Ballinora or Ballynora (Irish: Baile an Óraigh or Baile Nóra) is a small rural parish and townland near Cork city and Ballincollig in County Cork, Ireland. The townland, which lies in the civil parish of Kilnaglory, is home to several education facilities and sporting clubs. The village of Waterfall is nearby.

== History ==
Evidence of ancient settlement in the townland of Ballinora include a number of ringfort and fulacht fiadh sites. A cross-inscribed stone was also discovered in the area.

The parish church in Ballinora, St. James' Church, was built c. 1820. The church, which is in the Roman Catholic Diocese of Cork and Ross, underwent a major renovation in 2009. The former Bishop of Cork and Ross, Cornelius Lucey (1902–1982), went to school in the area.

== Amenities ==
Ballinora is home to a community hall, Ballinora and Ballymaw GAA grounds, a scout hall (used by the 109th Cork Scouting Ireland group), a pub, a garden centre, and Ballinora National School. As of 2024, Ballinora National School had 300 pupils enrolled.

== Sport ==
The local GAA club, Ballinora GAA, was founded in 1924. The club's colours are green and red, and it fields hurling and Gaelic football teams in the Muskerry division of Cork GAA. Ballinora GAA's main pitch is adjacent to Ballinora National School.

Richmond FC is the local association football (soccer) club. Founded in 1980, the club has pitches at Ballyhank in Waterfall and Garranedarra in Bishopstown. Alan Bennett, who is from the area and received a number of caps the national team, began his football career with the club.
