= Ballinhassig railway station =

Railway station in Ireland

Ballinhassig

General information
- Location: Ballinhassig, County Cork; Ireland
- Coordinates: 51.8095°N 8.5606°W
- Elevation: 287 ft (87 m)

History
- Opened: 1849
- Original company: Cork and Bandon Railway
- Pre-grouping: Cork, Bandon and South Coast Railway
- Post-grouping: Great Southern Railways

Key dates
- 1 August 1849: Station opens
- 1 November 1851: Station renamed Ballinhassig and Kinsale Road
- 27 June 1863: Station renamed Ballinhassig
- 1 April 1961: Station closes

Services
Preceding station	Cork and Bandon Railway	Following station
Waterfall	Cork-Bandon	Junction
Location

Ballinhassig railway station was on the Cork and Bandon Railway in County Cork, Ireland.

== History ==
The station opened on 12 June 1851. Regular passenger services were withdrawn on 1 April 1961.

On 1 November 1851 the station was renamed Ballinhassig & Kinsale Road and on 27 June 1863 it was renamed Ballinhassig.

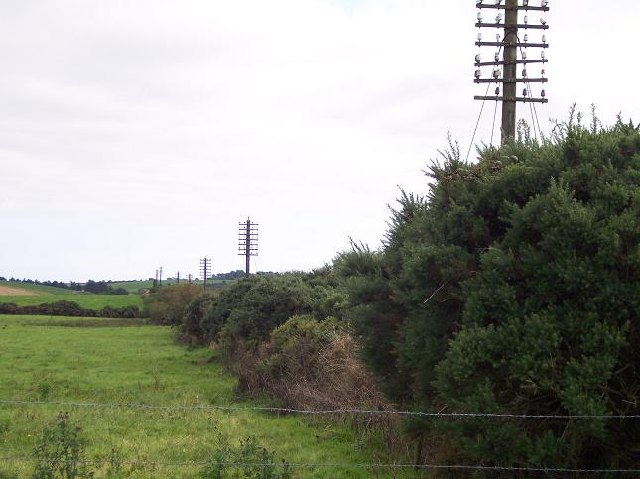
Near Ballinhassig with the telegraph poles running along the closed line in 2005.
