= Bandon railway station =

Railway station in Ireland

Bandon
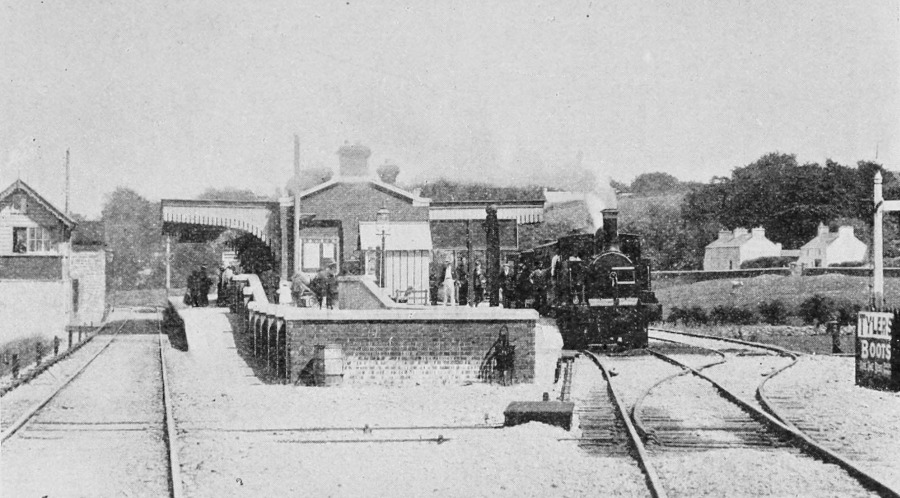
- Bandon station c.1898

General information
- Location: Bandon, County Cork; Ireland
- Coordinates: 51.7462°N 8.7287°W

History
- Opened: 1 August 1849
- Closed: 1 April 1961
- Original company: Cork and Bandon Railway
- Pre-grouping: Cork, Bandon and South Coast Railway
- Post-grouping: Great Southern Railways

Services
Preceding station	Disused railways	Following station
Upton and Innishannon	Cork and Bandon Railway; Cork-Bandon	Terminus
Terminus	West Cork Railway; Bandon-Dunmanway	Bandon West
Location
- Location within County Cork Location within Ireland

Bandon railway station was a station in County Cork, Ireland, serving the town of Bandon. It was opened by the Cork and Bandon Railway in 1849, and closed in 1961.

== History ==
The station opened on 1 August 1849. It was rebuilt in 1894. There was a rail connection from the station to the nearby Allman's Bandon Distillery.

Regular passenger services were withdrawn on 1 April 1961.

The 1890s red-brick station building still exists, in use as offices as at 2009.
