= Kinsale railway station =

Railway station in Ireland

Kinsale

General information
- Location: Kinsale, County Cork; Ireland

History
- Original company: Cork and Kinsale Junction Railway
- Pre-grouping: Cork, Bandon and South Coast Railway
- Post-grouping: Great Southern Railways

Key dates
- 27 June 1863: Station opens
- 31 August 1931: Station closes
Location

Kinsale railway station was on the Cork and Kinsale Junction Railway in County Cork, Ireland.

== History ==
The station opened on 27 June 1863.

Regular passenger services were withdrawn on 31 August 1931.

== Routes ==
Preceding station	Disused railways	Following station
Farrangalway	Cork and Kinsale Junction Railway; Junction-Kinsale	Terminus
