= Skibbereen railway station =

Former station in County Cork, Ireland

Skibbereen

General information
- Location: Skibbereen, County Cork; Ireland
- Coordinates: 51.55343°N 9.26920°W

History
- Original company: Ilen Valley Railway
- Pre-grouping: Cork, Bandon and South Coast Railway
- Post-grouping: Great Southern Railways

Key dates
- 23 July 1877: Station opens
- 1 April 1961: Station closes
Location

Skibbereen railway station was on the Ilen Valley Railway in County Cork, Ireland.

== History ==
The station opened on 23 July 1877.

Regular passenger services were withdrawn on 1 April 1961.

== Routes ==
Preceding station	Disused railways	Following station
Madore	Ilen Valley Railway; Dunmanaway-Skibbereen	Terminus
Terminus	Baltimore Extension Railway; Skibbereen-Baltimore	Creagh
Terminus	Schull and Skibbereen Railway; Skibbereen-Schull	Newcourt
