= Baltimore railway station =

Former railway station in Ireland

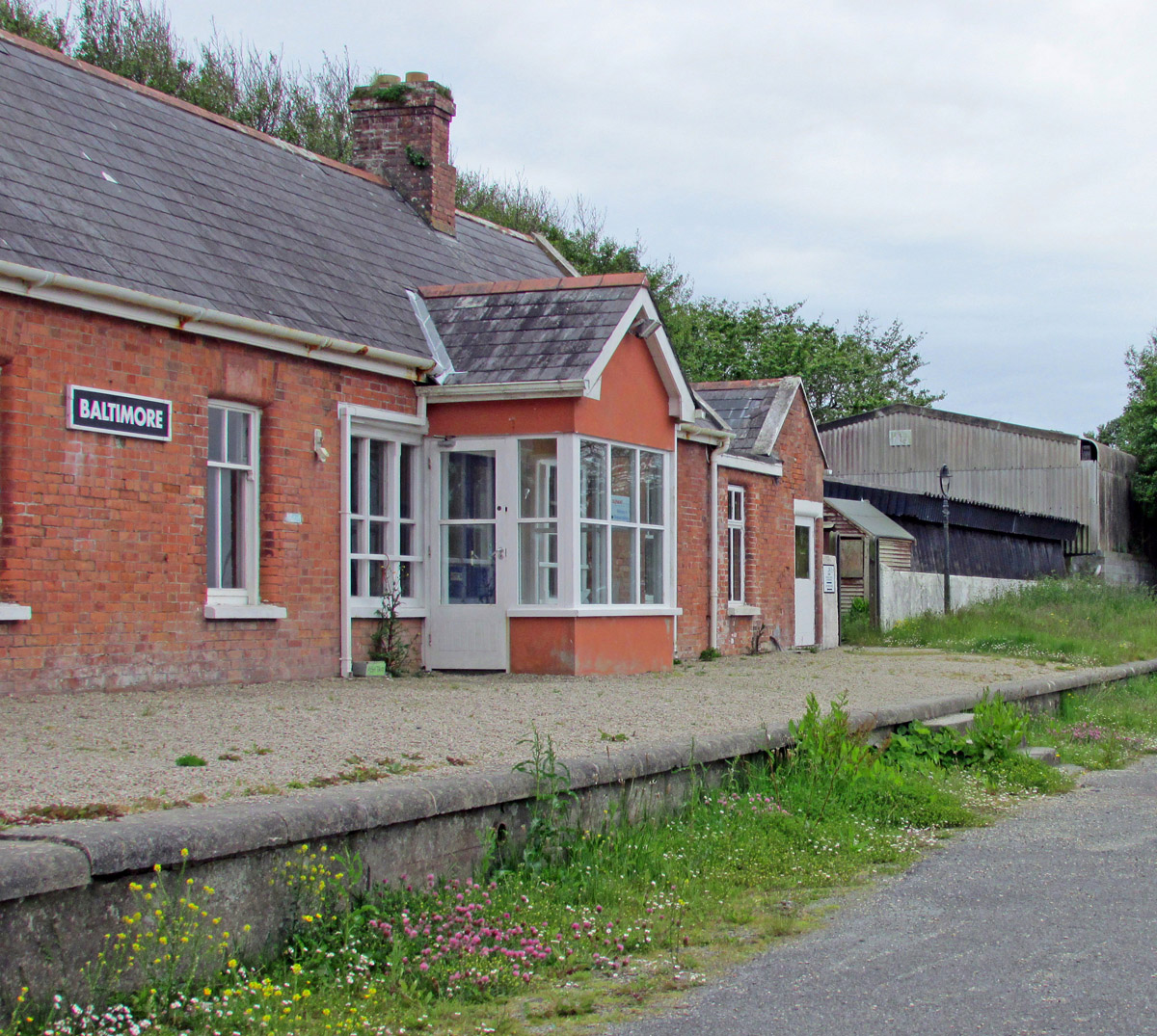
- The closed station in 2014 with adjoining surviving passenger platform in the foreground

General information
- Location: Baltimore, County Cork; Ireland
- Coordinates: 51.48472°N 9.37194°W

History
- Opened: 2 May 1893
- Closed: 1 April 1961
- Original company: Baltimore Extension Railway
- Pre-grouping: Cork, Bandon and South Coast Railway
- Post-grouping: Great Southern Railways

Services
Preceding station	Baltimore Extension Railway	Following station
Creagh	Skibbereen-Baltimore	Terminus
Location

Baltimore railway station was the terminus of the Baltimore Extension Railway in County Cork, Ireland.

== History ==
The station was opened for passenger traffic on 2 May 1893. It consisted of a brick built station building with slate tiled roof and fully surfaced platforms. It was located at the southern terminus of the branch line from Skibbereen and was the most southerly railway station in Ireland.

Regular passenger services were withdrawn on 1 April 1961.

The station building, platform and a semaphore railway signal remained disused but in situ. The building was used as a sailing school starting from 1969, that school integrated the "Glénans Irish sailing club" in the 80s. In 2011 these were incorporated into the French "École des Glénans". That club left the building end of 2013, it is disused since.
