= Junction railway station =

Rail station in County Cork, Ireland

Junction
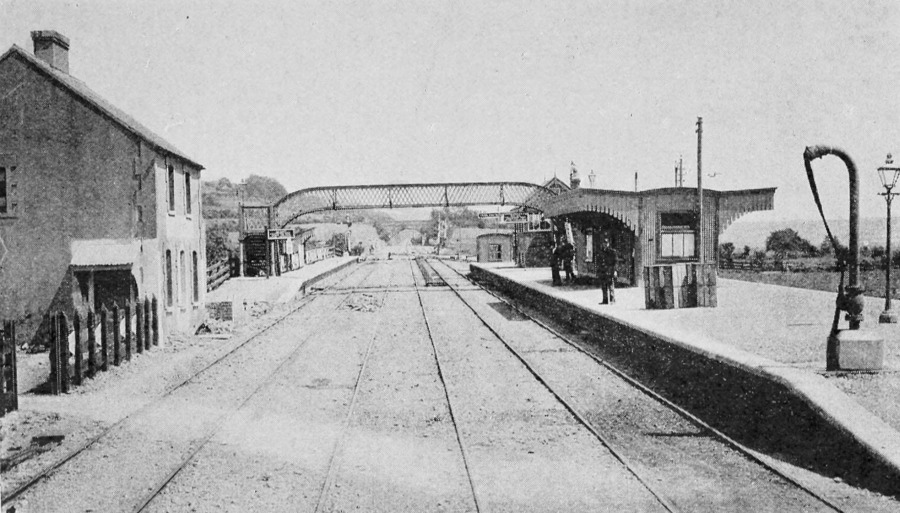
- Junction station c1898

General information
- Location: County Cork; Ireland

History
- Original company: Cork and Bandon Railway
- Pre-grouping: Cork, Bandon and South Coast Railway
- Post-grouping: Great Southern Railways

Key dates
- 27 June 1863: Station opens as Kinsale Junction
- 1 November 1886: Station renamed Junction
- 1 July 1938: Station renamed Crossbarry
- 1 April 1961: Station closes
Location

Junction railway station was just outside the village of Crossbarry, on the Cork and Bandon Railway in County Cork, Ireland.

== History ==
The station opened as Kinsale Junction on 27 June 1863. It was renamed Junction on 1 November 1886. It was further renamed Crossbarry on 1 July 1938.

Regular passenger services were withdrawn on 1 April 1961.

== Routes ==
Preceding station	Disused railways	Following station
Ballinhassig	Cork and Bandon Railway; Cork-Bandon	Upton and Innishannon
Terminus	Cork and Kinsale Junction Railway; Kinsale Junction-Kinsale	Ballymartle
