= Clonakilty railway station =

Railway station in Ireland

Clonakilty
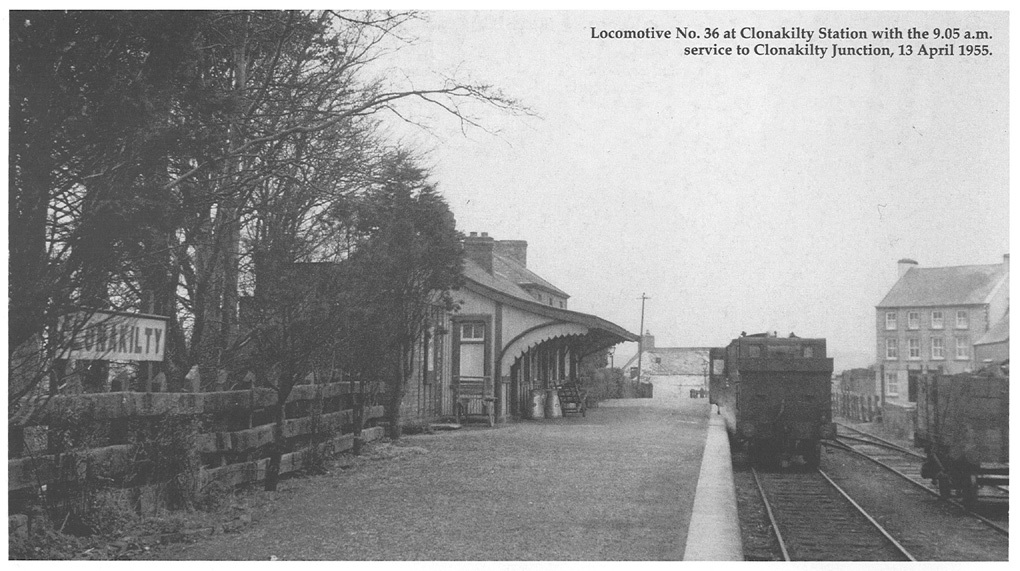
- Clonakilty station in April 1955

General information
- Location: Clonakilty, County Cork; Ireland

History
- Original company: Clonakilty Extension Railway
- Pre-grouping: Cork, Bandon and South Coast Railway
- Post-grouping: Great Southern Railways

Key dates
- 1 November 1886: Station opens
- 1 April 1961: Station closes
Location

Clonakilty railway station was on the Clonakilty Extension Railway in County Cork, Ireland.

== History ==
The station opened on 1 November 1886.

Regular passenger services were withdrawn on 1 April 1961.

== Routes ==
Preceding station	Disused railways	Following station
Ballinascarthy	Clonakilty Extension Railway; Clonakilty Junction-Clonakilty	Terminus
