= Timoleague and Courtmacsherry Railway =

Defunct rail system in County Cork, Ireland

- Ballinascarthy and Timoleague Junction Light Railway; Timoleague and Courtmacsherry Extension Light Railway

Overview
- Owner: Timoleague and Courtmacsherry Extension Light Railway
- Locale: Ireland
- Termini: Timoleague; Courtmacsherry

Service
- Type: Light railway

History
- Opened: 21 April 1891
- Closed: 1960

Technical
- Line length: 9 mi (14 km)
- Number of tracks: Single track
- Track gauge: 1,600 mm (5 ft 3 in)

The Timoleague and Courtmacsherry Railway was a 9-mile (14 km) long light railway connecting Timoleague station and Courtmacsherry station. It was the last roadside railway operating in Ireland.

== History ==
The railway was incorporated in October 1888 and opened on 21 April 1891. It was originally considered to be built as a 3 ft (914 mm) narrow gauge track but then executed as a standard gauge light railway, partly running along a road. There were two companies, the Timoleague and Courtmacsherry Light Railway and the Ballinascarthy and Timoleague Junction Light Railway which were both worked by the Timoleague and Courtmacsherry Extension Light Railway. It became a constituent of Great Southern Railways in 1925. It was originally operated by two locomotives, both from the Leeds works of the Hunslet Engine Company, named Slaney and St. Molaga. These two were joined in 1894 by a third locomotive, again from Hunslet, with the name Argadeen.

Passenger services were withdrawn on 24 February 1947 due to the coal shortages. Thereafter it operated only for summer excursions and the winter beet harvest. Summer passenger excursions operated every Sunday from Cork Albert Quay railway station and they were well supported from the small stations on route. The pace at which the trains rounded the sharp curves of the roadside track contributed to the atmosphere for which these excursions were renowned. The entire West Cork Railway terminated without warning in the autumn of 1960.

== Gallery ==
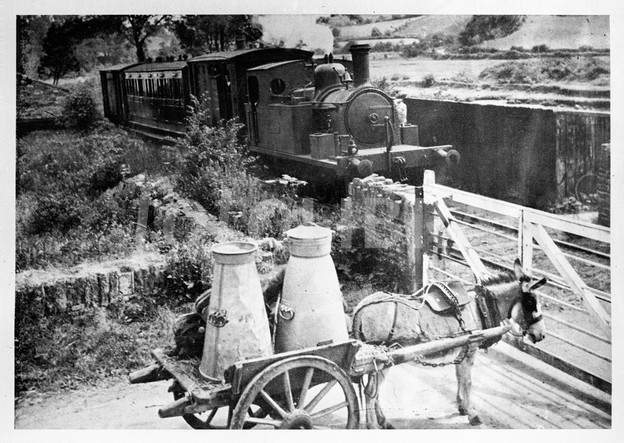
Courtmacsherry train with 2-6-0T locomotive Argadeen entering Timoleague Station in the 1910s

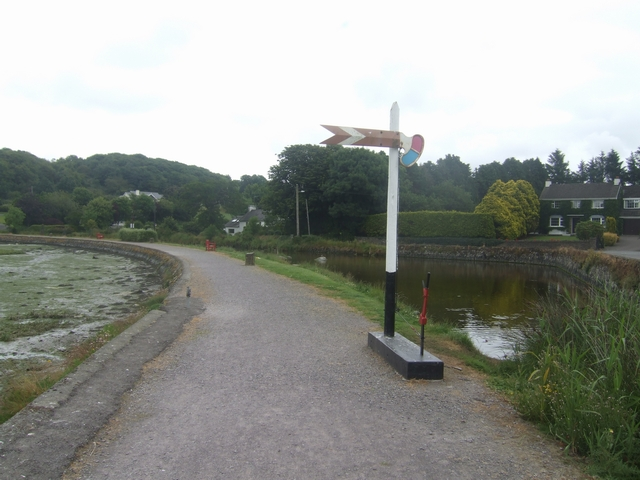
Causeway of the Timoleague and Courtmacsherry Light Railway
