= Cork Albert Quay railway station =

Railway station in County Cork, Ireland

Cork Albert Quay
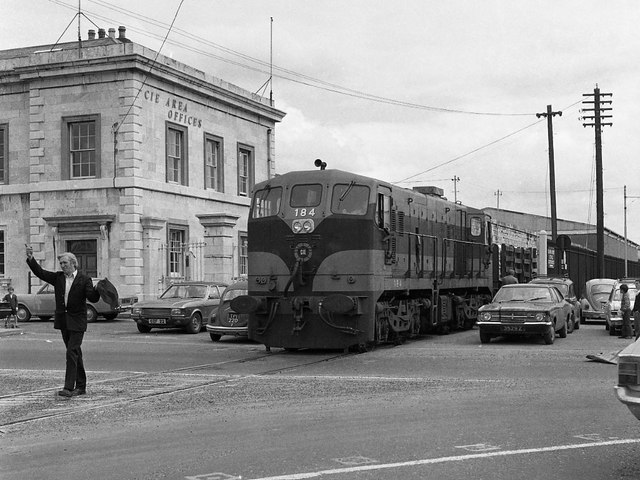
- A diesel locomotive hauls a freight transfer out of Albert Quay station on its way to Glanmire Road on 18 July 1975

General information
- Location: Cork, County Cork; Ireland
- Coordinates: 51.898274°N 8.462113°W

History
- Opened: 8 December 1851; 174 years ago
- Closed: 1 April 1961; 65 years ago
- Original company: Cork and Bandon Railway
- Pre-grouping: Cork, Bandon and South Coast Railway
- Post-grouping: Great Southern Railways
Location

Cork Albert Quay railway station was on the Cork, Bandon and South Coast Railway in County Cork, Ireland.

== History ==
The station opened on 8 December 1851 with services to Bandon, County Cork. From 1866 to 1879 and 1925 to 1935 it was also the terminus of the Cork and Macroom Direct Railway.

Regular passenger services were withdrawn on 1 April 1961.

== Building ==
In the early 21st century some of the remaining listed/protected structures bordering the Albert Quay station were incorporated into the Enterprise Ireland "Webworks" office development on Eglinton Street and Albert Quay. This included the building formerly housing the CIÉ area offices, which is now known as Albert Quay House.

== Routes ==
| Preceding station | Disused railways | Following station |
|---|---|---|
| Terminus | Cork and Bandon Railway; Cork-Bandon | Waterfall |
| Terminus | Cork and Macroom Direct Railway; Cork-Macroom 1866-1879 | Ballincollig |
| Terminus | Cork and Macroom Direct Railway; Cork-Macroom 1925-1927 | Bishopstown |
| Terminus | Cork and Macroom Direct Railway; Cork-Macroom 1927-1935 | Ballincollig |

== Gallery ==
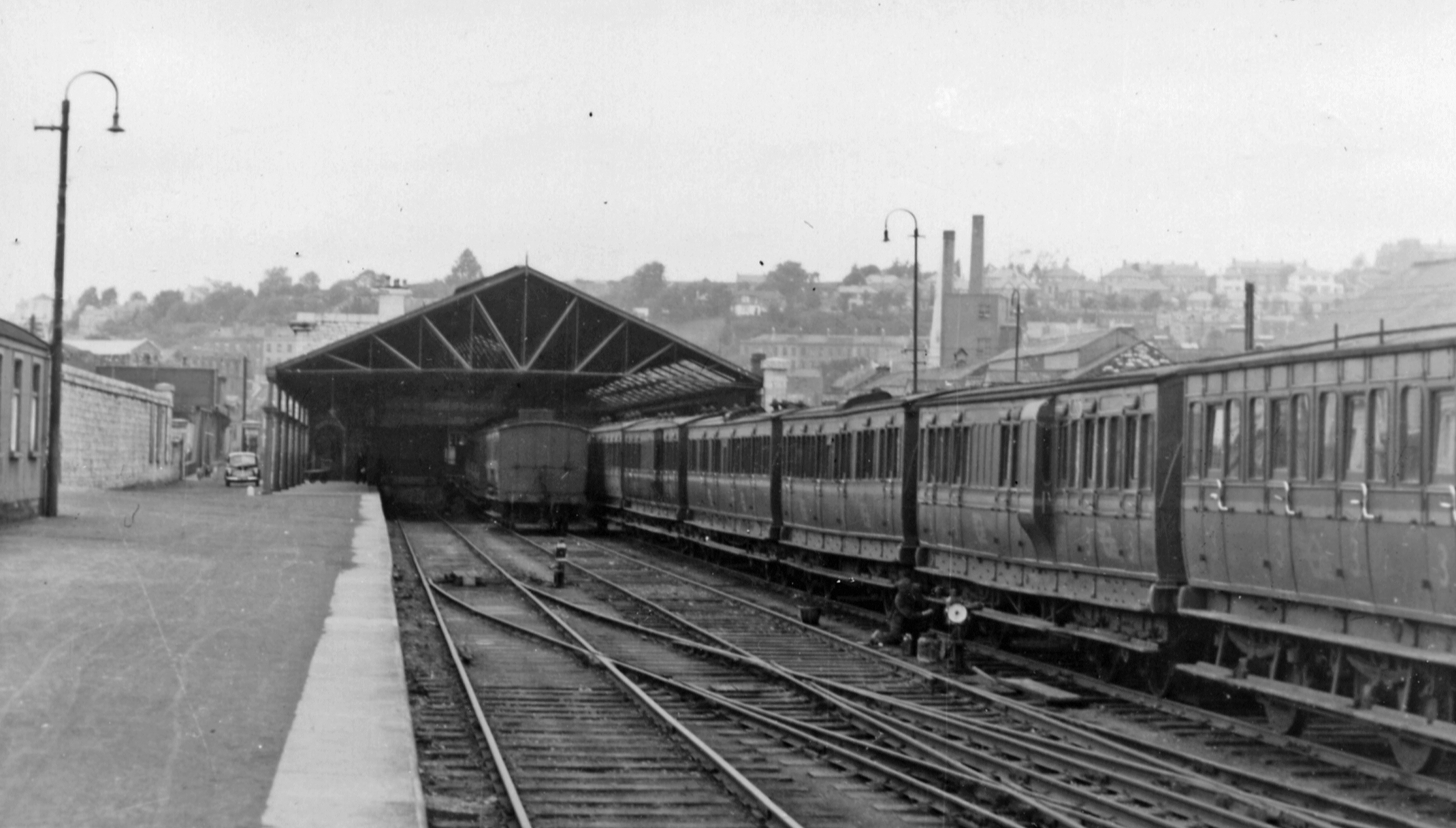
File:Cork, Albert Quay station; Cork, Bandon & South Coast Railway, 1948

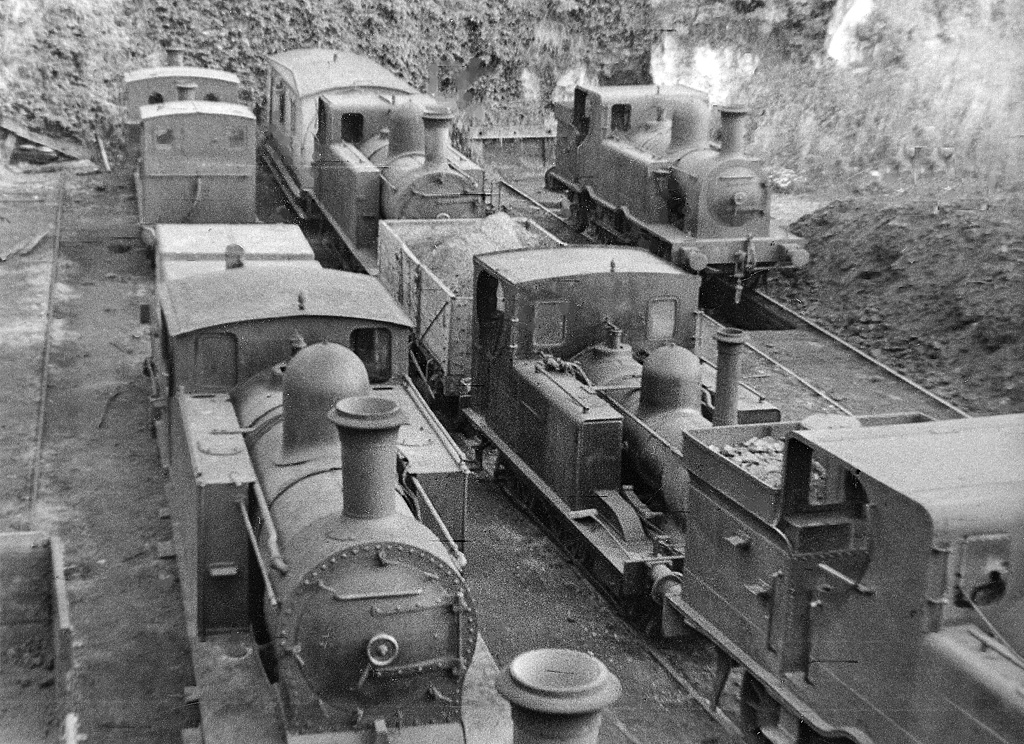
Steam locomotives stored outside the station 17 July 1955.

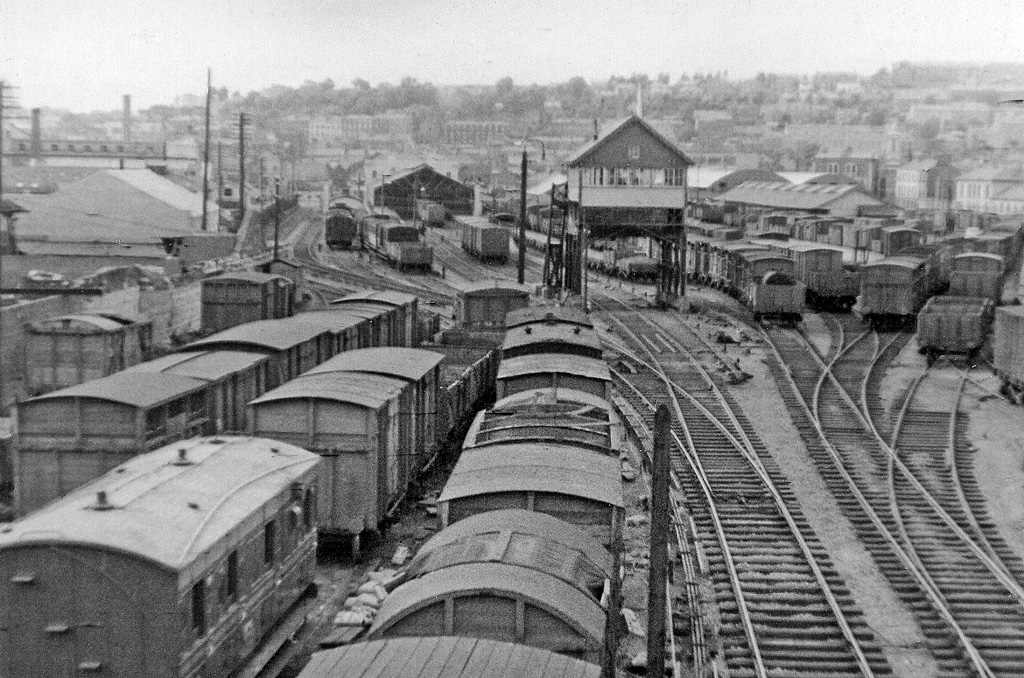
Goods wagons stored in the yard 17 July 1955.
