= Cork, Bandon and South Coast Railway =

Defunct Irish railway company and system

- Lines owned by CBSCR; Separate undertaking of CBSCR (Note: Bantry Extension Railway); Lines worked by CBSCR but owned by other companies (Note: Skibbereen–Baltimore owned by Baltimore Extension Railway. Clonakility branch owned by Clonakilty Extension Railway.)

Overview
- Dates of operation: 1849–1961
- Successor: Great Southern Railways

Technical
- Track gauge: 5 ft 3 in (1,600 mm)
- Length: 94 miles 10 chains (151.5 km) (1919)
- Track length: 112 miles 60 chains (181.5 km) (1919)

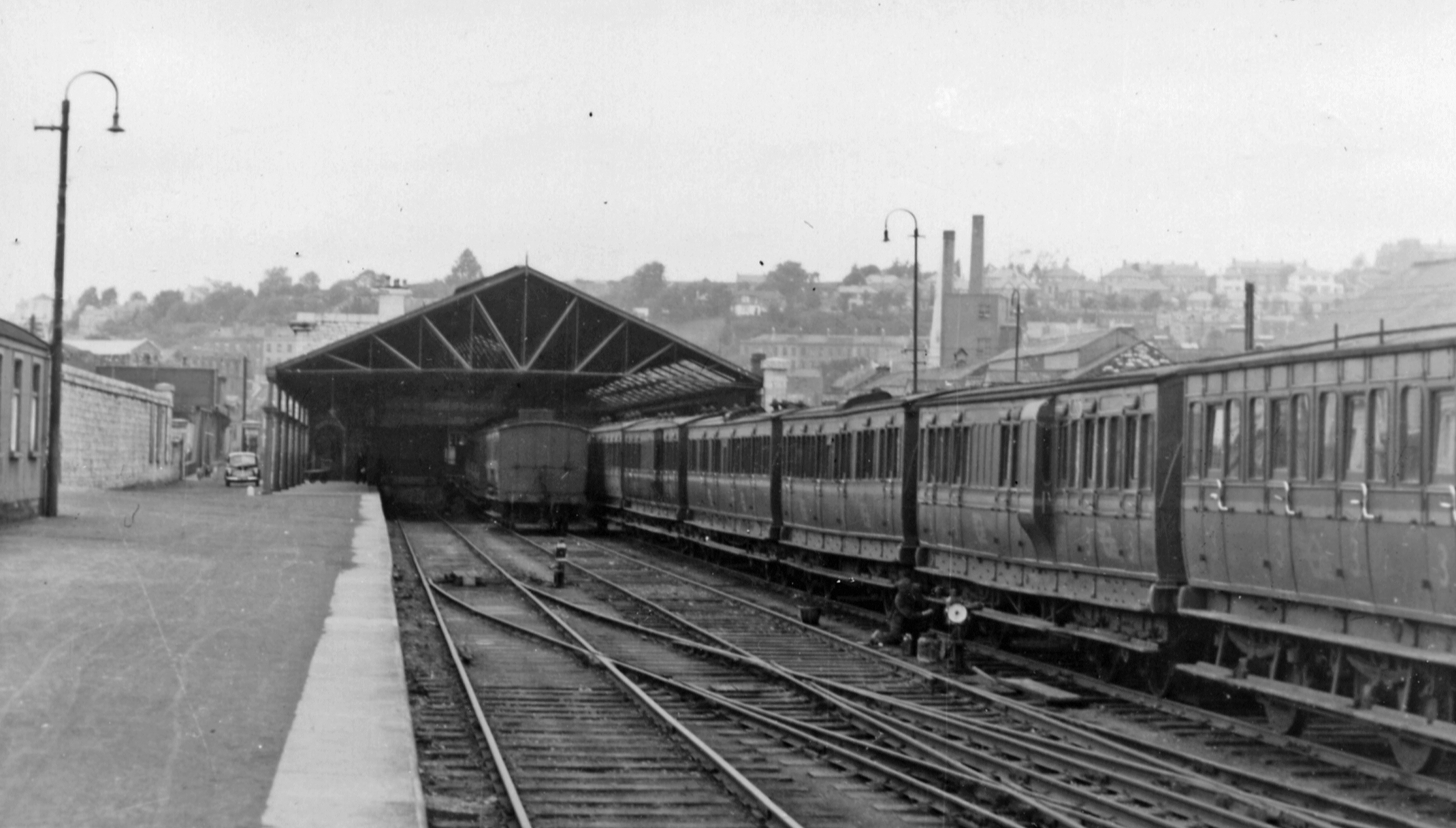
Albert Quay terminus Cork, 1948

The Cork, Bandon and South Coast Railway (CB&SCR) was an Irish gauge (1,600 mm (5 ft 3 in)) railway in Ireland. It opened in 1849 as the Cork and Bandon Railway (C&BR), changed its name to Cork Bandon and South Coast Railway in 1888 and became part of the Great Southern Railway (GSR) in 1924.

The CB&SCR served the south coast of County Cork between Cork and Bantry. It had a route length of 94 miles (151 km), all of it single track. Many road car routes connected with the line, including the route from Bantry to Killarney.

Following absorption into the GSR and the network could be referred to as the West Cork Railways (Note: The West Cork Railway Company was specifically a company that built and operated the main line between Bandon and Dunmanway between 1860 and 1880 until absorbed. Post nineteenth century (South-)West Cork Railway/Railways/System generally refers to network emanating out of Cork Albert Quay station with West Cork Line referring to the main line to either Skibbereen or Bantry) or variations thereof, this also encompassing the former previously independent Cork and Macroom Direct Railway and the Timoleague and Courtmacsherry Railway.

== History ==
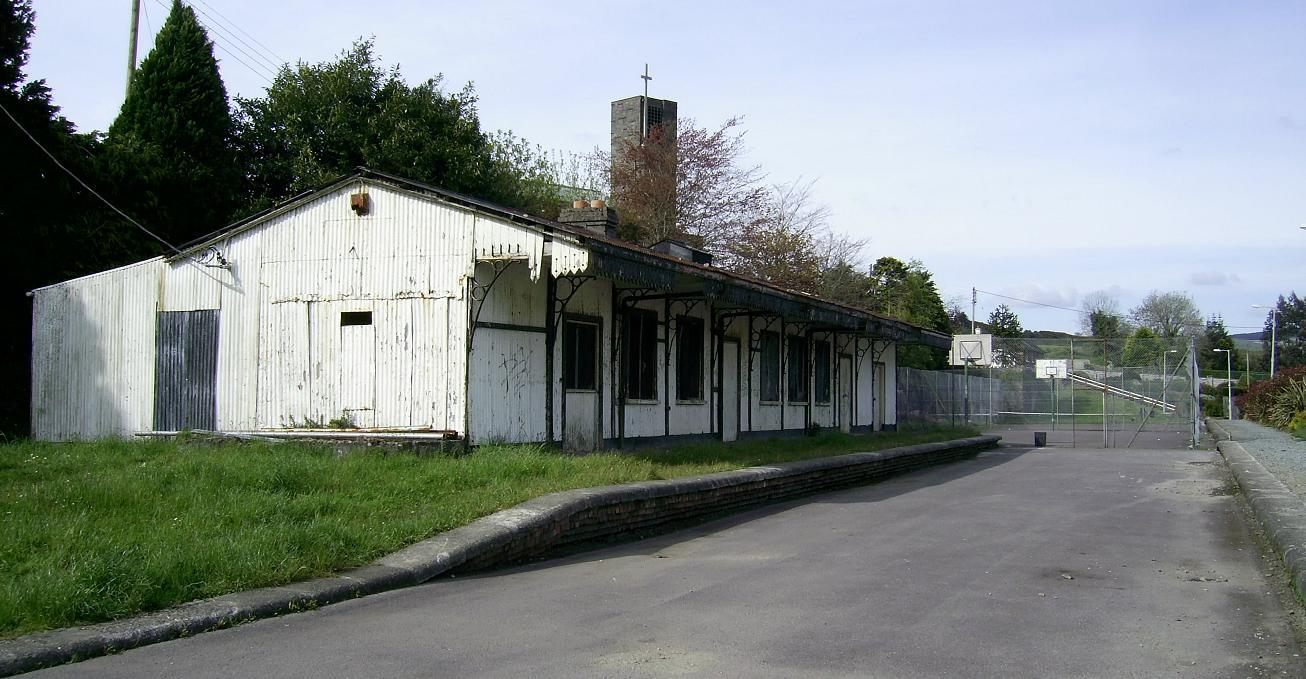
Surviving station building and platforms at Drimoleague

The Cork and Bandon Railway was formed by the Cork and Bandon Railway Act 1845 (8 & 9 Vict. c. cxxii) and began operations on the 6 3/4 miles (10.9 km) from Bandon to Ballinhassig from 1 August 1849, 25 seat horse omnibuses being used for transfers to and from Cork City. The 13 1/2 miles (21.7 km) section from Ballinhassig to Cork opened to public services on 1 December 1851. The C&BR was financially challenged after by building the Bandon to Cork section which had some costly overruns and future extensions to the network were undertaken by independent companies some of which operated their own services for a number years.

=== Extensions to the railway ===
The Cork and Kinsale Junction Railway (C&KJR) company built the first extension to the railway to the port of Kinsale. It was authorised by the Cork and Kinsale Junction Railway Act 1859 (22 Vict. c. xxiii), opened in 1863, and was operated by the C&BR from the outset. The 11 miles (18 km) branch left the main line some 13 miles (21 km) from Cork at a station simply called Junction and was notable for some long 1-in-76 and 1-in-80 gradients. The C&BR completed purchase of the line from the C&KJR on 1 January 1880.

The West Cork Railway (WCR) was formed by the West Cork Railways Act 1860 (23 & 24 Vict. c. cciii) with the intention of extending the line to Skibbereen, the C&BR being in favour of such an extension but without the ability to raise the capital itself. The WCR opened the 17 3/4 miles (28.6 km) section from Bandon to Dunmanway in June 1866 and operated the section itself hiring in rolling stock and locomotives from elsewhere. There were ongoing tensions between the WCR and C&BR especially at Bandon with independent stations and goods transfer disputes. The WCR itself was unable to resource the building of the 16 miles (26 km) Dunmanway to Skibbereen section which was completed by the Ilen Valley Railway (IVR) opening in 1877. Following arbitration, the section was worked by the WCR. The operating situation agreed to was resolved on 1 January 1880 by running the network under a single operational management, the C&BR leasing the IVR until absorbing it in the Cork, Bandon and South Coast Railway Act 1909 (9 Edw. 7. c. xxxii) whilst concluding terms to absorb the WCR in October 1882.

12 May 1866 saw the opening of the independently operated Cork and Macroom Direct Railway (C&MDR) which initially used the Cork Albert Quay terminus before almost immediately branching off on a 24 miles (39 km) line to Macroom. Toll charges and sharing difficulties led to C&MDR to use its own newly built terminus at Cork Capwell from 27 September 1879 with the connection C&BR severed soon thereafter.

The IVR completed an 11 miles (18 km) branch from Drimoleague to Bantry which it leased to the C&BR to operate from 1 July 1881.

In 1886 Skibbereen became an interchange with the 914 mm (3 ft) narrow gauge Schull and Skibbereen Railway.

The Clonakilty Extension Railway (from Clonakilty Junction), 9 miles (14 km), authorised by Clonakilty Extension Railway Act 1881 (44 & 45 Vict. c. ccxvi), opened on 24 August 1886 and was operated by the C&BR. A 0.5 miles (800 m) long siding for a flour mill owned by the Bennett family at Shannonvale about 2 miles (3 km) north of Clonakilty was notable for being horse-operated. The siding was created in 1887 and extended to the mill shortly thereafter and remained horse operated until closure in 1961. Horse traction was used uphill, and trains were worked by gravity downhill.

On 21 September 1887 a draft bill was submitted to the company's board. The draft would give the C&BR powers to construct a 1 mile 41 chains (2.4 km) line to avoid Gogginshill Tunnel, at an estimated cost of £10,702. Other powers to be granted included a connecting line to the Cork, Blackrock and Passage Railway, extensions to Cork's quays, and closure of the Gas Works level crossing. Cork Corporation objected to the quay line and level crossing closure, and the connection to the Cork, Blackrock and Passage was defeated. The Cork, Bandon and South Coast Railway Act 1888 (51 & 52 Vict. c. lxxxvii) passed on 5 July, changing the name of the C&BR to the Cork, Bandon and South Coast Railway (CB&SCR). Powers to build the line avoiding Gogginshill Tunnel were granted in this act of Parliament, but the line was never built.

The Timoleague and Courtmacsherry Railway opened and operated as a 9 miles (14 km) independent branch from Ballinascarthy on the Clonakilty branch with stations at Skeaf, Timoleague and terminated at the seaside village at Courtmacsherry.

22 October 1892 saw the opening of an extension of the Bantry branch by 1 1/4 miles (2.0 km) by another company, the Bantry Extension Railway, through to the pier at Bantry Bay, the CB&SCR again leasing the line. Direct passenger services onto the pier were introduced in 1908 to connect with Bantry Bay steamers. These services ceased in 1936 and the pier was dismantled in 1949.

An 8 miles (13 km) extension from Skibbereen to Baltimore by the Baltimore Extension Railway was operated by the CB&SCR from May 1893. Baltimore was a port on the southernmost extent of Ireland and increased the length of the CB&SCR to 61 1/4 miles (98.6 km).

1 January 1912 saw Cork City Railways creating a connection between the CB&SCR and the rest of the Irish rail network by running a road tramway across the road bridges over the River Lee from immediately before Cork Albert Quay across to the Great Southern and Western Railway at Glanmire Road.

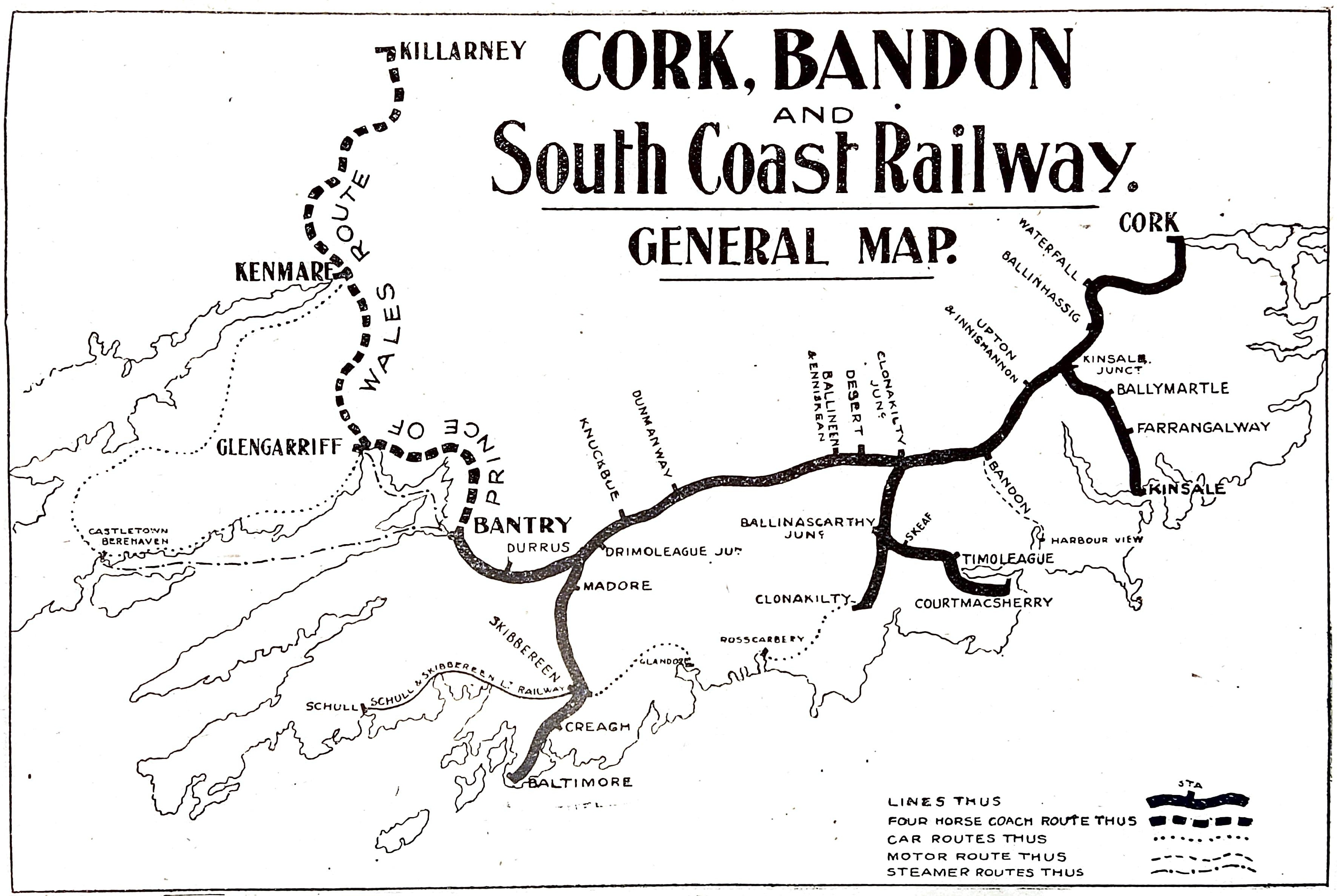
1920 map of the railway

The CB&SCR was subject to various damaging incidents during the 1922—1923 Irish Civil War, the most damaging to the railway being the partial destruction of the Chetwynd Viaduct on 9 August 1922. Passenger services were restored between Cork and Bandon on 20 February 1923, with full service across the network being restored on 23 May.

=== GSR and CIÉ years ===
The CB&SCR, Great Southern and Western Railway, and Midland Great Western Railway were amalgamated into the Great Southern Railway (GSR) in 1924. It then amalgamated with the Dublin and South Eastern Railway to form the Great Southern Railways in 1925, absorbing the smaller railways within the Irish Free State. An early action of the new combined management was to re-instate the connection between the former CB&SCR and C&MDR railways so the line from Macroom could use the terminus at Cork Albert Quay to achieve some operating economies.

Due to mounting losses the Kinsale branch was closed on 31 August 1931. A parliamentary question asked in February 1934 sought to prevent the line from being lifted, but the relevant minister lacked the power to do so. The line was fully lifted that summer. The junction station remained open, being renamed Crossbarry in October 1936.

The GSR was consolidated into Córas Iompair Éireann in 1945.

CIÉ introduced AEC railcars to the railway in 1954.

=== Closure ===
Due to economic problems, competition from road traffic and falling passenger numbers, the line closed on 1 April 1961. The planned closure of the railway network met with strong local opposition, including the establishment of the West Cork Railways Association. At a meeting of Cork County Council's Southern Committee on 3 October 1960, councillors were very critical of CIÉ's running of the line.

A report published by a local pressure group in 2022 suggested that the railway in West Cork could feasibly return. This suggestion was rejected by Minister for Transport Eamon Ryan.

== Route ==
The system was completely built as single track with passing facilities provided at most stations. As a condition of loans from the Board of Works some infrastructure on the main line was built to accommodate later conversion to double track, this had implications for costs particularly at Gogginshill Tunnel.

=== Rocksavage works ===
The Rocksavage works and yard serviced the CB&SCR rolling stock and was situated at the south end of the site encompassing the Cork Albert Quay terminus complex. The works built a single locomotive, the 4-4-0T CB&SCR No. 7/GSR No. 478 in 1901 that was composed mostly of parts salvaged from other locomotives. On amalgamation to the GSR in 1925 major repair work was transferred to Inchicore with Rocksavage being used for light repairs.

=== Major infrastructure ===
==== Chetwynd Viaduct ====
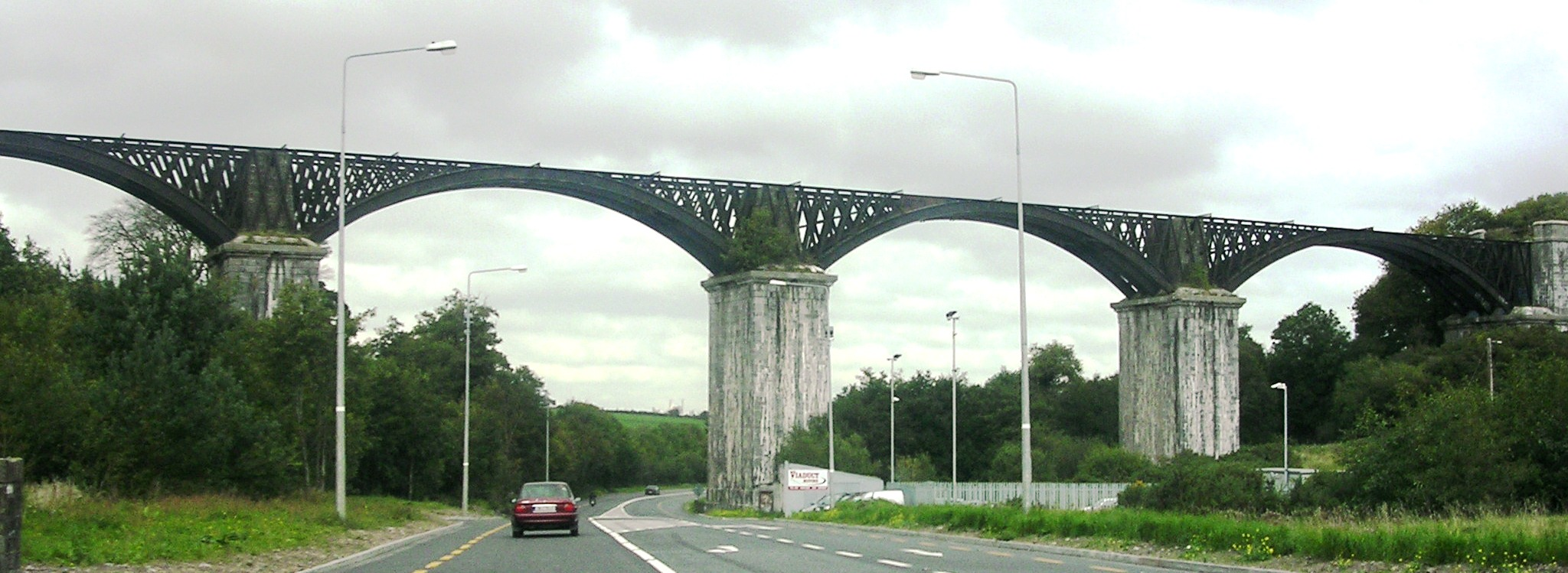
Chetwynd Viaduct

The Chetwynd Viaduct carried the line over a valley and the main Bandon road (now the N71) between the townlands of Chetwynd and Rochfordstown about 2 miles (3 km) southwest of Cork city. It was designed by Charles Nixon (a former pupil of Isambard Kingdom Brunel), and built between 1849 and 1851 by Fox, Henderson and Co, which also built the Crystal Palace in London.

The 100 feet (30 m) cast iron ribs were cast on site. When in situ they had transverse diagonal bracing and lattice spandrels that supported a deck of iron plates. These in turn supported the permanent way. The viaduct is 91 feet (28 m) high, has four 110 feet (34 m) spans, each span composed of four cast iron arched ribs, carried on masonry piers 20 feet (6 m) thick and 30 feet (9 m) wide. The overall span between end abutments is 500 feet (150 m).

The structure was seriously damaged in the Irish Civil War in 1922, but was subsequently repaired. It was in regular use until the line was closed in 1961, though "recovery" trains continued to use it during the dismantling of the line until at least 1965. The bulk of the decking was in place as late as 1970, other than at the ends, but this was all subsequently removed for safety reasons.

==== Gogginshill Tunnel ====
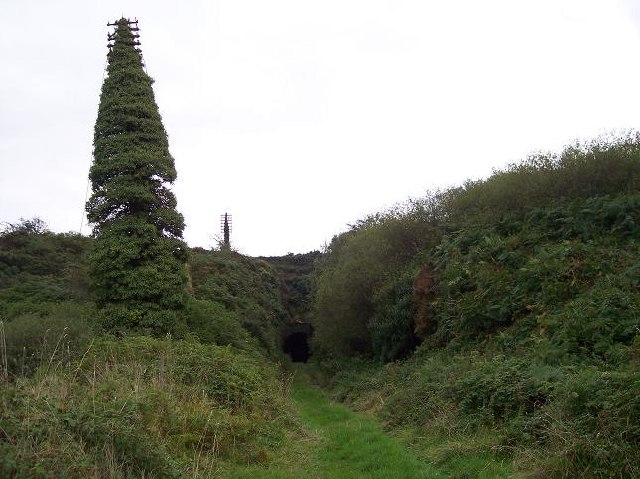
Approach cutting to Gogginshill Tunnel

The Gogginshill Tunnel near Ballinhassig in County Cork, was constructed between February 1850 and December 1851 by 300 men working day and night. There are three ventilation shafts and the tunnel is lined with brick, which was added between 1889 and 1890 after some minor collapses of the rock face.

It is the longest abandoned railway tunnel within the Republic of Ireland, measuring 906 yd (828 m) end to end.

==== Halfway Viaduct ====
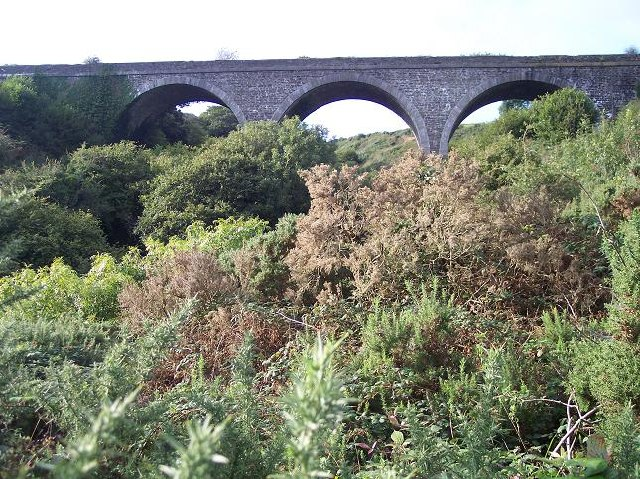
Halfway Viaduct

The viaduct is located at Halfway, between Innishannon and Ballinhassig, about 30 m (98 ft) above the valley floor. It is a three arch viaduct of masonry construction.

==== Kilpatrick Tunnel ====
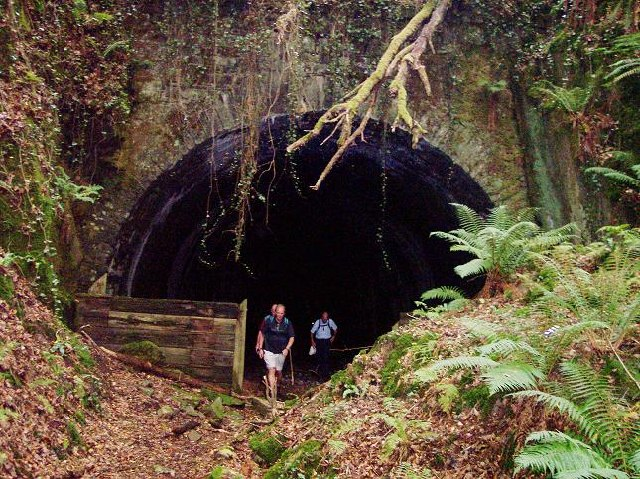
Kilpatrick Tunnel east portal

The Kilpatrick (Innishannon) tunnel is 122 m (400 ft) in length and located less than 1 km (0.62 mi) west of Inishannon, just before the River Bandon crossing. (Note: Bairstow claims the tunnel is 170 yards (160 m) long and when opened on 30 June 1849 was the first railway tunnel in Ireland, and also claims the Innoshannon Viaduct was just west of the tunnel.)

== Services ==
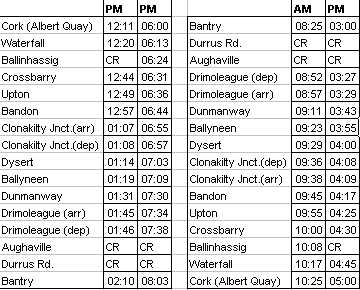
1948 Cork to Bantry timetable

Passenger services on the C&BR and CB&SCR were of low frequency with most routes seeing up to a handful of trains each way a most, with connections being of poor quality at times.

Regular diesel railcar operations began on the Cork to Bantry service from 28 May 1954 and permitted a reduction in journey time of 38 minutes. Railcars and the 550 hp C-Class diesel locomotives had replaced steam on all but a freight service to Courtmacsherry by July 1957. The large A class locomotives were used on 2 trial runs, one going to Skibbereen and another going to Clonakilty.

=== 1948 Timetable ===
On the right is the Cork to Bantry passenger timetable that was operational from 1948 until the closure in 1961. A few points may be noted from it:

- Travel time was about 2 hours. In 2008, a car journey (without the nine intermittent stops) is less than 30 minutes faster, according to the AA website.
- It was not possible to make a same-day return journey from Bandon to Dublin as the Cork express train left at 9:00 am (arriving at 12:00 pm) and departed at 2:25 pm from Heuston (which would have allowed the 6:00 pm connection to Bandon to be made though).

== Rolling stock ==
Following the 1924 grouping the Great Southern Railway inherited 20 locomotives from the CB&SCR. At some point the CB&SCR was recorded as having 68 coaching vehicles and 455 goods vehicles.

=== Locomotives ===
Over 40 steam locomotives were used by the C&BR/CB&SCR, mostly of the tank variety though some early examples had tenders. The most notable are generally considered to be the 4-6-0T Bandon Tanks build by Beyer, Peacock & Company between 1908 and 1920. Also of note are two Baldwin locomotives, the 0-6-2ST design of 1900 being the only instance of steam locomotives supplied from America to Ireland.

=== Livery ===
The locomotives and carriages wore various shades of olive green often with yellow lining.

== Legislation ==
- Cork and Bandon Railway Act 1845
- Cork and Bandon Railway (Extension, Deviation and Amendment) Act 1847
- Cork and Bandon Railway Amendment Act 1852
- Cork and Bandon Railway Act 1853
- Cork and Bandon Railway (Skibereen Branch) Act 1854
- Cork and Kinsale Junction Railway Act 1859
- Cork and Kinsale Junction Railway Act 1863
- Cork and Kinsale Junction Railway Act 1868
- Cork and Kinsale Junction Railway (Arrangement) Act 1878
- West Cork Railways Act 1860
- West Cork Railways Act 1865
- West Cork Railways Act 1867
- Dunmanway and Skibbereen Railway Act 1872
- Ilen Valley Railway Act 1874
- Ilen Valley Railway (Bantry Extension) Act 1878
- Clonakilty Extension Railway Act 1881
- Cork and Bandon and Clonakilty Extension Railways Act 1884
- Cork, Bandon and South Coast Railway Act 1888
- Cork, Bandon and South Coast Railway Act 1900
- Cork, Bandon and South Coast Railway Act 1909

== See also ==
- History of rail transport in Ireland
- History of Durrus and District
