= Church of St Mary and St John =

Church in County Cork, Ireland

Coordinates: 51.8858°N 8.5906°W

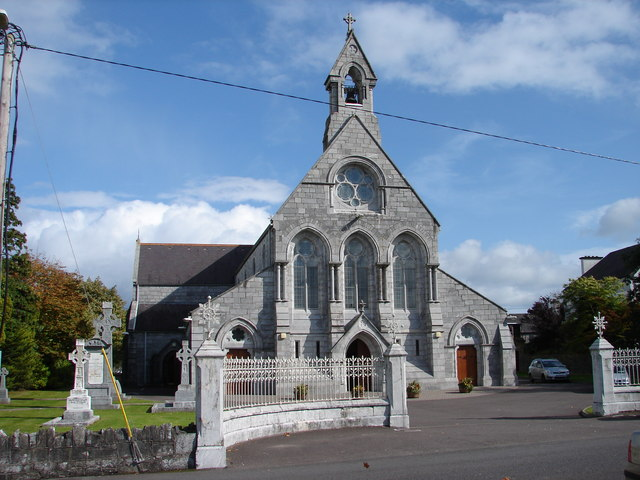
Church of St Mary and St John

The Church of St Mary and St John is the older of two Roman Catholic churches in the town of Ballincollig, County Cork, Ireland. The church was built in the 1860s, funded by donations from the local people of the time, and officially opened on 28 October 1866. The church is in a Gothic Revival style, combined with some features of other periods. It is built of ashlar limestone with roof slates. The church is included in the Record of Protected Structures maintained by Cork City Council.

== First church ==
Up to 1808, Catholic residents of Ballincollig had to travel to Ballinora, Kilnaglory or Clash Cross in Carriganarra to attend mass. An increase in the Catholic population, largely due to the expansion of the Ballincollig Royal Gunpowder Mills, made it necessary for a new church to be erected in Ballincollig. This new church became the parish church - replacing Ballinora as the main church in the area.

The first church was built in 1808 by Fr. Nicholas O’Riordan P.P. in the building which is now occupied by the community hall. The site was given by Charles Henry Leslie for 960 years at the rent of 6d (2½ p.) per year. Leslie also donated 100 guineas towards the cost of building the church. The Bishop of Cork, Francis Moylan, was involved in the negotiations for the site. After the closure of this church building in 1866, it was converted to use as a school.

== New church ==
The ceremony to lay the foundation stone of a new Roman Catholic Church in Ballincollig was led by the Right Rev. Dr. Delany, Bishop of Cork, on 13 August 1865. The population of the parish of Ballincollig had grown so large that for a considerable time the chapel which stood on the south side of the village was unable to cope with the large attendances.

The new site was on higher ground less than 100 yards to the south of the old church. It was on the property of Thomas Wise who gave the site free of charge. He also gave the use of a quarry at his property in Coolroe, a short distance away, where all the stone was needed for the building could be got. Other funds were provided by the management of the nearby Gunpowder Mills - with some sources attributing these donations as an attempt to appease some sections of the local population.

The total cost was expected to be about £5,000, half of which had already been raised by the time of the foundation laying ceremony. This ceremony followed a mass in the old church. The Bishop led a procession to the site of the new church, where a service and ceremonial sprinkling of holy water took place. The Bishop then blessed the foundation stone, and it was then formally laid. A collection was made in aid of the funds for the new church and nearly £100 was subscribed on the spot.

== Architecture ==
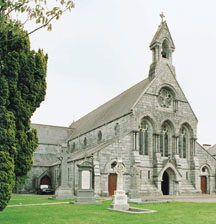
Church facade

The building was designed by George Goldie. Goldie had already designed many other churches in England and Ireland. The design of the church was neo-gothic in style, which was typical of this period. Goldie also combined features from other periods, giving Ballincollig church some "unique" characteristics.

== Construction ==
The builder employed to construct the church was Mr. Barry McMullen of Cork. The walls of the church were made of ashlar limestone (i.e. limestone which had to be individually chiselled into blocked).

The stained glass for the windows was supplied by messrs. Wiles of Newcastle in England. The windows vary in shape and size from the narrow pointed type (neo-Gothic) to the rose shaped-windows. The window shapes incorporate limestone tracery. The names of a number of people who contributed to the construction of the church can be seen on some of the windows. For example, the stained glass window behind the statue of Mary was donated by Barry McMullen, and reads: "Pray for Barry McMullen Builder of the church". Others read: "Pray for George Goldie Architect of this church" and "Pray for the very Rev David Horgan of Cork, Priest of Ballincollig who erected the church with help of his parishioners and all the faithful- A.D. 1866".

The metalwork in the church was done by messrs. Peard and Jackson of London. Much of this ornate metalwork has now been removed, e.g. the altar railings, the metal brackets which held the oil lamps. The railings on the outer wall of the church are the most visible examples of their work.

Another feature of the church is the belfry with its pointed top. It is another example of the Gothic style of architecture. It is made from blocks of limestone and is surmounted with a stone cross. The bell itself was supplied by Sheridan of Dublin.

== Dedication ceremony ==
On 28 October 1866, the church of St. Mary and St. John was dedicated by the Right Rev. Dr. Delaney, Lord Bishop of the Diocese of Cork. A large number of people came to witness the dedication, with special trains running on the Cork and Macroom Railway. During the dedication mass, the very Rev. Fr. Brigitt delivered a sermon which included passages from the gospel of Luke VI, V and VI: "And when Jesus came to the place, looking up he saw him and said to him, 'Zacheus, make haste and come down, for this day I must abide in thy house'." Fr. Brigitt said that the building indicated that the spirit of Zacheus was reflected in the people of Ballincollig.
