= Ballincollig =

Town in Cork city, Ireland

Ballincollig Baile an Chollaigh
- Town
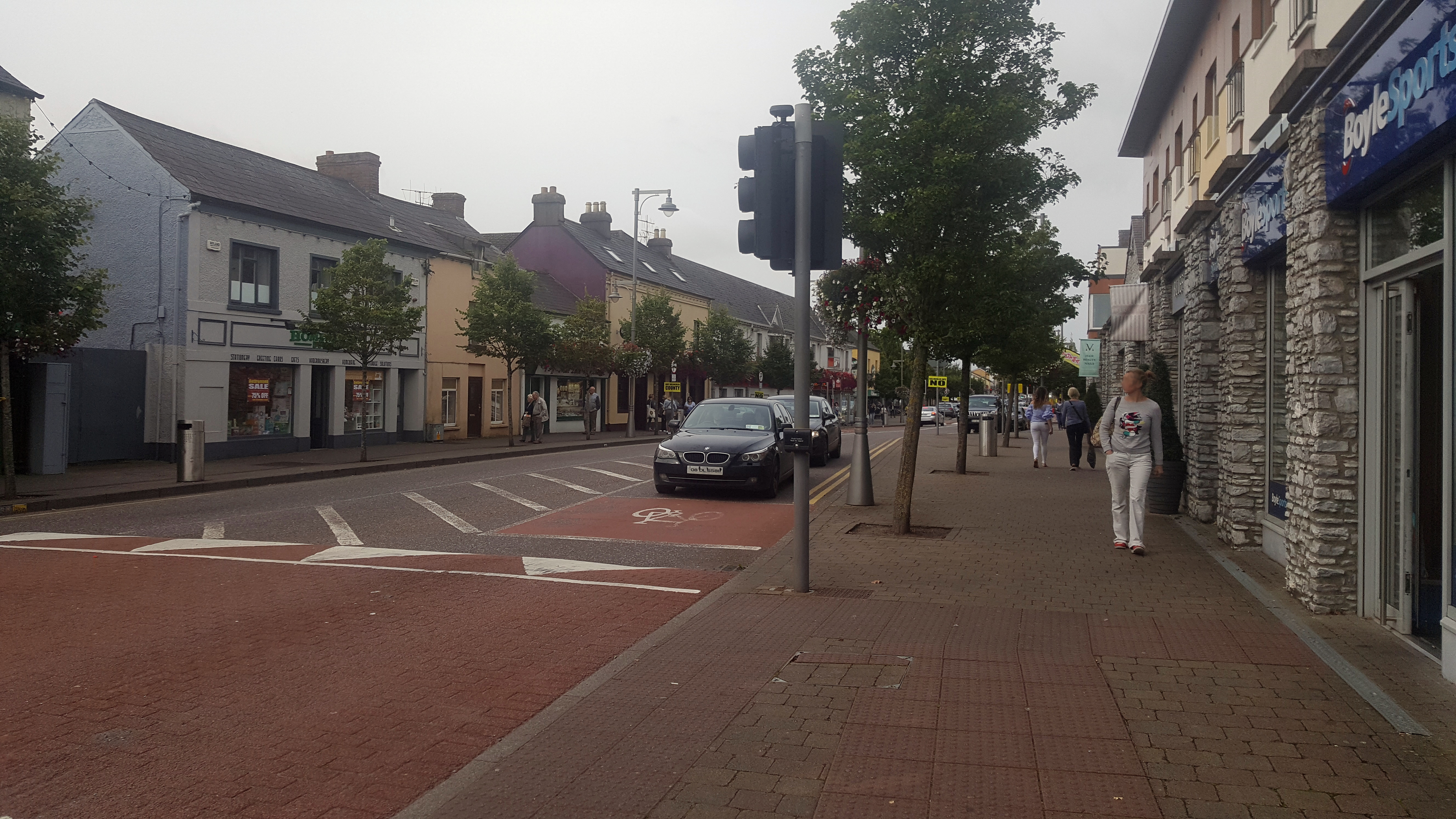
- Ballincollig's main street

- Location in Ireland
- Coordinates: 51°53′16.54″N 8°35′21.44″W
- Country: Ireland
- Province: Munster
- County: Cork

Government
  - Type: Cork City Council
  - Dáil Éireann: Cork North-Central
  - European Parliament: South
- Elevation: 66 ft (20 m)

Population (2016)
  - Total: 18,621
- Time zone: UTC±0 (WET)
  - Summer (DST): UTC+1 (IST)
- Eircode routing key: P31
- Telephone area code: +353(0)21
- Irish Grid Reference: W595708
- Website: ballincollig.ie

Historical population
Year	Pop.	±%
1841	1,287	—
1851	789	−38.7%
1861	917	+16.2%
1871	524	−42.9%
1881	1,130	+115.6%
1891	836	−26.0%
1901	746	−10.8%
1911	815	+9.2%
1926	220	−73.0%
1936	260	+18.2%
1946	300	+15.4%
1951	986	+228.7%
1956	1,105	+12.1%
1961	1,151	+4.2%
1966	1,246	+8.3%
1971	2,110	+69.3%
1981	7,231	+242.7%
1986	10,522	+45.5%
1991	12,124	+15.2%
1996	13,288	+9.6%
2002	14,591	+9.8%
2006	15,760	+8.0%
2011	17,368	+10.2%
2016	18,621	+7.2%

Ballincollig (Irish: Baile an Chollaigh) is a suburban town within the administrative area of Cork city in Ireland. It is located on the western side of Cork city, beside the River Lee on the R608 road. In 2016 it was the largest town in County Cork, at which time the Ballincollig Electoral Division had a population of 18,621 people. At around 8 km west of the centre of Cork city, it is located beyond the green belt from the suburbs of Bishopstown and Wilton. Historically home to the Ballincollig Royal Gunpowder Mills which is now a Regional Park, the town has seen much growth in recent years as a satellite of Cork city. In 2024, Ballincollig was named the tidiest town in Ireland.

== History ==
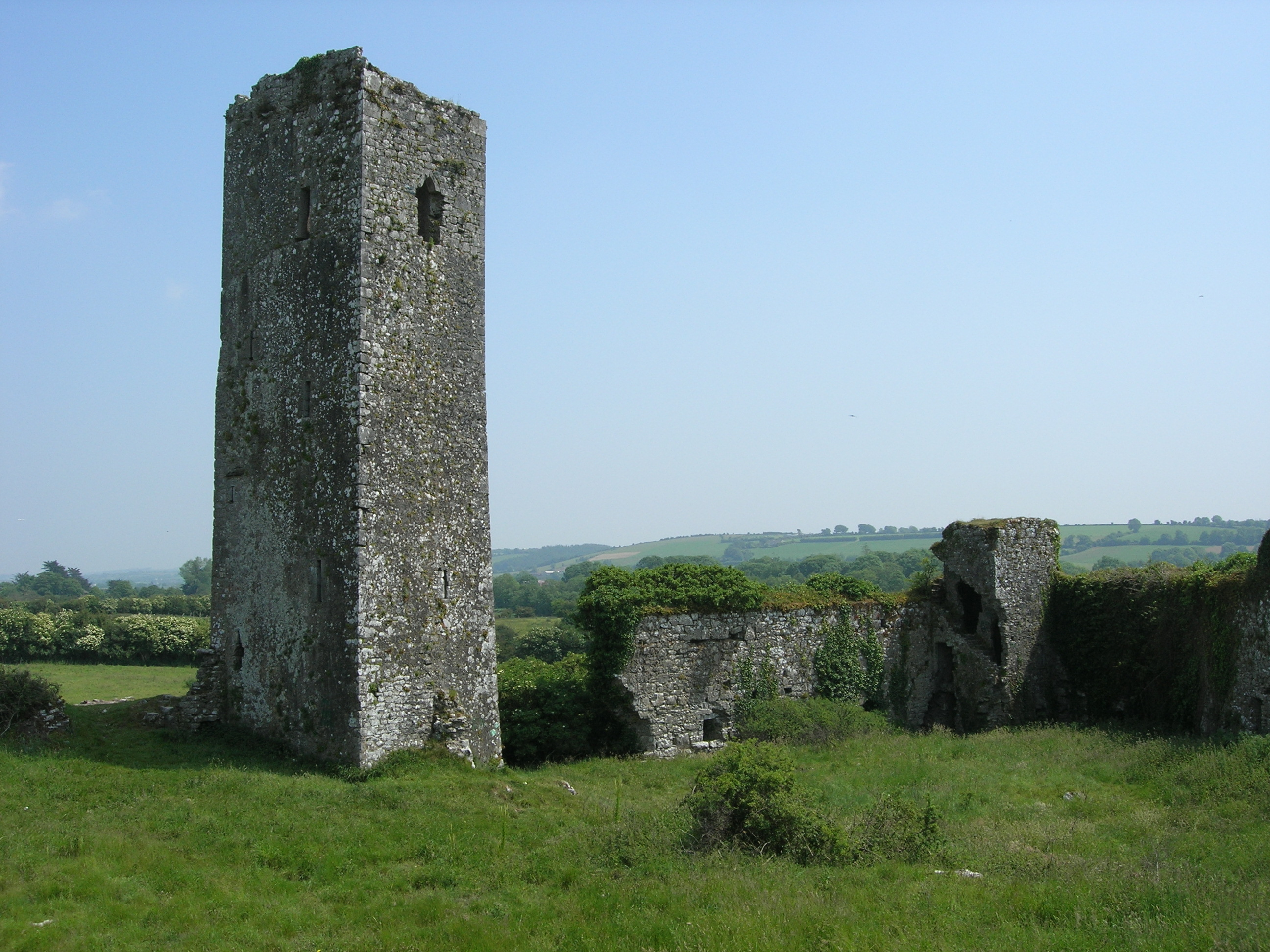
Ballincollig Castle lies to the south of the town

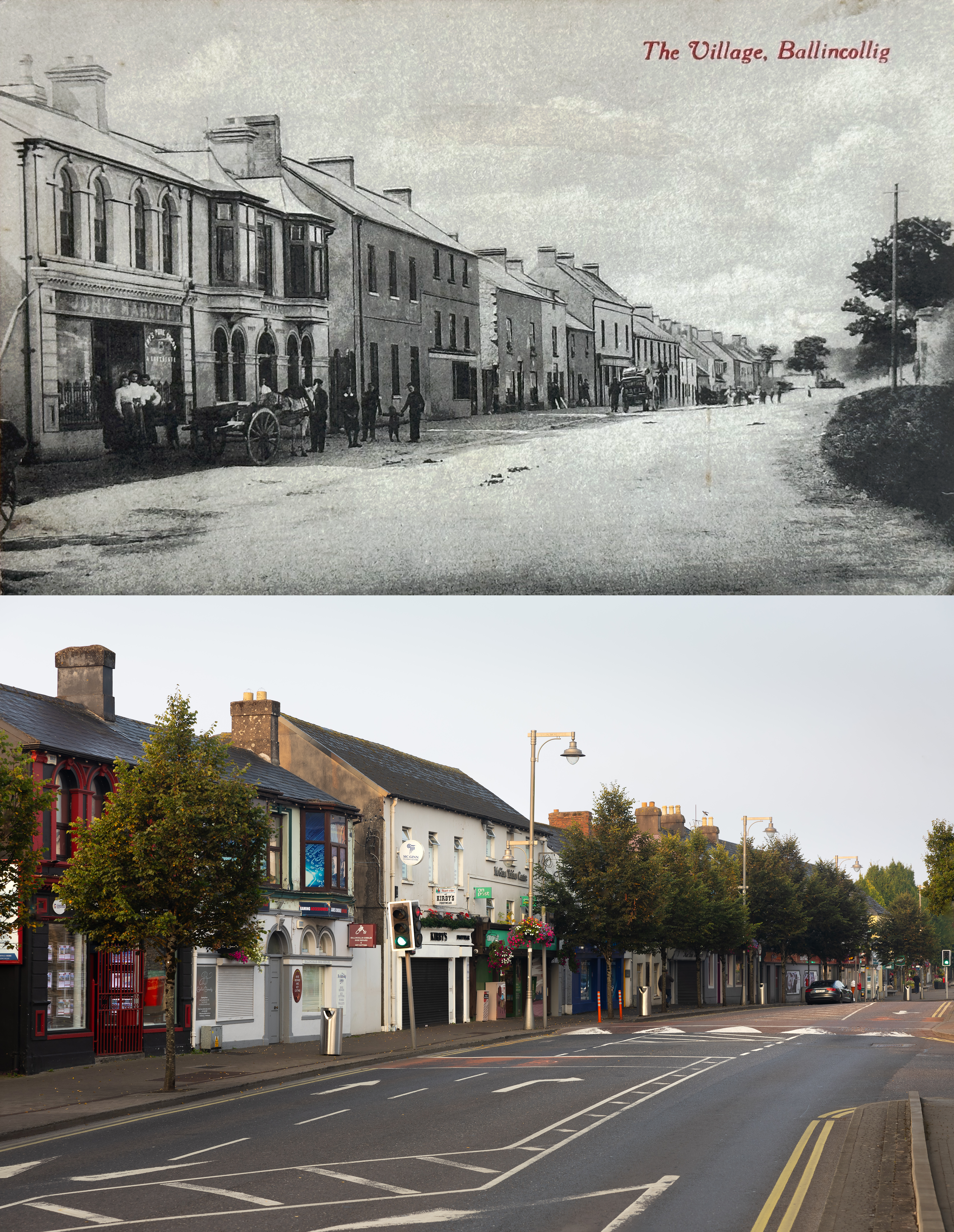
Main Street in the late 19th century, and the view of the same houses in 2024

Originally known as Maghmakeer as early as the 14th century, the town eventually came to be known after the Coll (or Cole) family who built Ballincollig Castle during the reign of Edward III, before selling it to the Barrett family in either 1468 or 1469. The castle was taken from Andrew Barrett by rebels in 1641, but they were expelled by English Parliamentary forces under Murrough O'Brien, Earl Inchiquinn, in 1645. It was garrisoned for James II in 1689, during the Williamite war in Ireland, then remained unoccupied after his defeat, and fell into decay.

The Ballincollig Royal Gunpowder Mills were opened in 1794 by Charles Henry Leslie, a prominent Cork businessman. Eleven years later, the mills were bought by the British, who were preparing for war with Napoleon. It was one of the largest gunpowder mills in the British Isles. In 1837, the mill employed several hundred workers, and by 1880, Ballincollig was one of the largest industrial establishments in Cork, with the mills employing many men and boys from the area. Ballincollig Barracks were built to protect the supply of gunpowder.

With the closure of the Gunpowder Mills in the early 1900s, Ballincollig became little more than a small village on the road from Cork city to the larger market town of Macroom. Murphy Barracks was a major source of employment. In the 1970s, Ballincollig developed as much more of a satellite town, with many housing developments constructed around the old village, and housing people who worked in Cork city or its suburbs. This expansion continued through the late 80s and 90s. Consequently, the town's population has risen dramatically, particularly with the westward expansion of the town and Ballincollig grew to be largest town in the county.

In 2019, as part of the boundary expansion of Cork city, Ballincollig was brought within the administrative area of Cork City Council.

== Religion ==
Two Catholic churches are located in the town. The modern 'Church of Christ Our Light' (designed by a local architectural firm) is located on the west side of the town, while the old 'Church of St Mary and St John' is located near the centre of the town, on Station Road.

The Bible Baptist Church meets in the Westgate Foundation on the west end of town. The church is associated with the Cork Bible Institute and other Gospel ministries.

== Demographics ==
As of the 2011 census, Ballincollig was 87% Catholic, 7% other religions, 5% no religion, with 1% not stated. Ethnically, the town is 83% white Irish, 10% other white, 3% black, 2% Asian, 1% other, and 1% not stated.

== Amenities ==
The amenities located in Ballincollig include a library, a multiplex cinema, playgrounds and shopping centres. Ballincollig Regional Park, a large park which includes the former gunpowder mill site, contains a number structures and canals associated with its former industrial use. The 135-acre (55-hectare) park contains several sports pitches, a playground and a series of marked trails.

Ballincollig is home to several crèches, five primary schools, and two secondary schools. The two secondary schools in Ballincollig are Coláiste Choilm and Ballincollig Community School. Ballincollig Community School is located in West Ballincollig and is next to the 'Church of Christ Our Light'. Coláiste Choilm is located in East Ballincollig and is near a doctor's practice and the town centre of Ballincollig. Two of the primary schools, Scoil Eoin and Scoil Mhuire, are located in the town centre near St Mary's and St John's church. Three of the primary schools, Scoil Barra, Gaelscoil Uí Ríordáin and Gaelscoil an Chaisleáin are located outside the centre. Several of the area's schools are Gaelscoileanna (Irish-speaking schools), providing for a large number of pupils who learn through the Irish language in the area.

In 2018, 2023 and 2024, the town won the "Large Urban Centre" category at the annual Tidy Towns awards. In 2024, it was named the tidiest town in Ireland.

== Places of interest ==
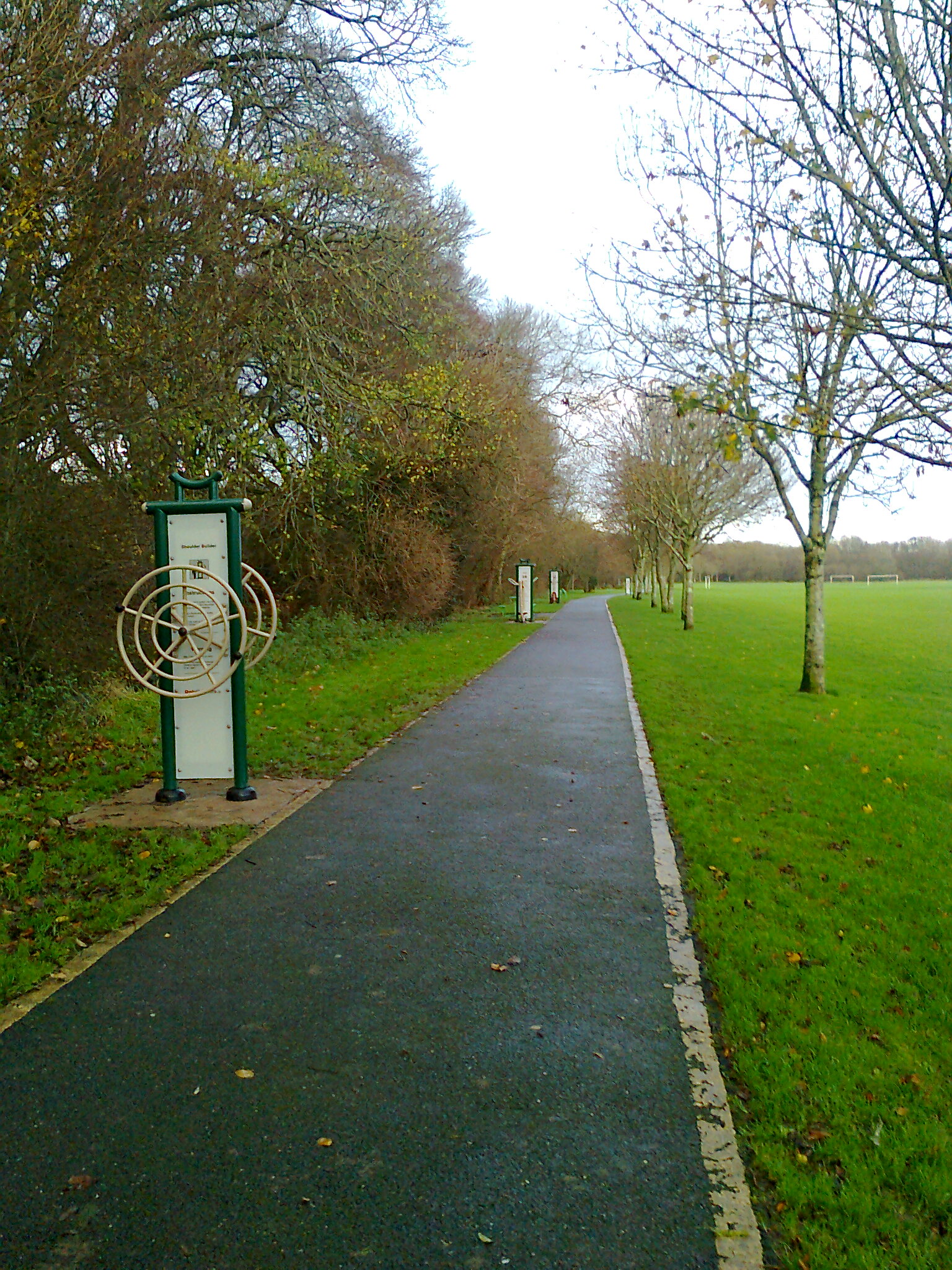
Outdoor fitness equipment in Ballincollig Regional Park

Ballincollig Regional Park, incorporating parts of the former Ballincollig Royal Gunpowder Mills, is on the north side of the town, along the River Lee. The 20-acre park contains a number of walking and cycling routes.

The grave of Rory Gallagher is located at St Oliver's Cemetery just outside Ballincollig. His headstone is a replica of an award he received in 1972 for International Guitarist of The Year.

The Coolroe Lime Kiln is an example of the historic quarrying in the Coolroe area of the town.

== Transport & communications ==
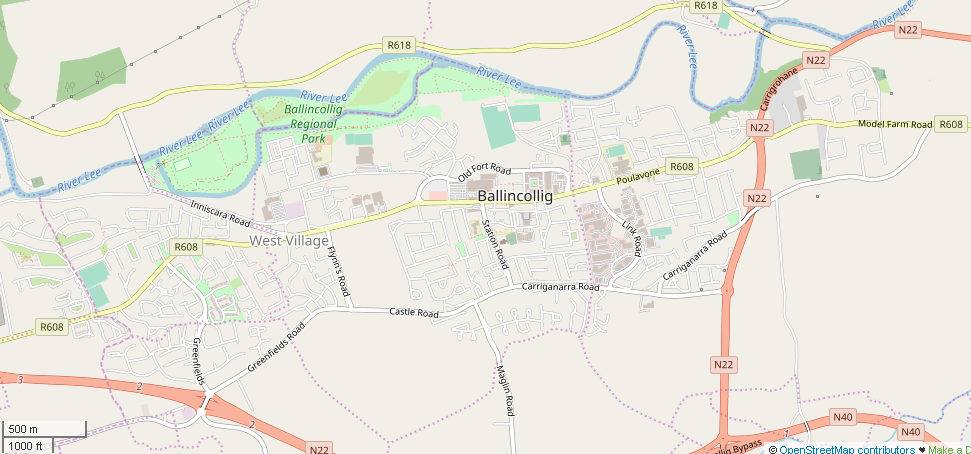
Map of Ballincollig

=== Rail ===
The Cork to Macroom rail line served Station House (at the south end of Station Road). Ballincollig railway station was opened on 12 May 1866, closed to passenger traffic on 1 July 1935, closed to goods traffic on 10 March 1947 and finally closed altogether on 1 December 1953.

A number of proposals, such as the 'Project Ireland 2040' transport plan, include a potential feasibility study into a possible suburban light rail project in the area connecting Ballincollig to Mahon point via UCC and Cork city centre.

=== Bus ===
Ballincollig is served by a number of Bus Éireann bus routes. These include route 220 (to Carrigaline, via UCC, Cork city centre, and Douglas), route 220X, (similar route via the Lee Fields rather than Bishopstown), and route 233 (Cork city centre to Macroom via Ballincollig).

=== Roads ===
Ballincollig was situated on the N22 from Cork to Tralee. A bypass around the town was opened in September 2004, which resulted in reduced journey times from Cork to Killarney on the N22 and reduced traffic volumes through the town centre. The N40 starts on the eastern side of the town that continues as the Cork southern bypass. The N40 and N22 both share exit 1.

The former alignment of the N22 is now the R608 road which goes through the town centre.

== Clubs and sport ==
Notable sports clubs in the town include: Ballincollig GAA Club and Ballincollig RFC. Mycro Sportsgear, which manufactures equipment for hurling, is based in Ballincollig.

Ballincollig is home to a thriving Scout group the 49th Cork who are based on station road. and celebrated 50 years of service to the youth of ballincollig in 2025.

== Notable people ==
- Samantha Barry, journalist, editor-in-chief of Glamour magazine
- Horace de Vere Cole, prankster and organiser of the 1910 Dreadnought hoax
- James Cronin, rugby player for Munster and Ireland
- Colin Healy, association footballer and manager
- Paddy Healy, All-Ireland winning hurler
- Paddy Kelly, All-Ireland winning Gaelic footballer
- Mick Mannock, recipient of the Victoria Cross has connections to Ballincollig
- John Miskella, All-Ireland winning Gaelic footballer
- Sanita Pušpure, world rowing champion
- Lord Robert Barden-Powell founder of the Scout Movement was stationed in Ballincollig Barrick in 1893 with the 13th hussars

== See also ==
- Metropolitan Cork
- List of towns and villages in Ireland
