= Crookstown, County Cork =

Village in County Cork, Ireland

Crookstown An Baile Gallda
- Village
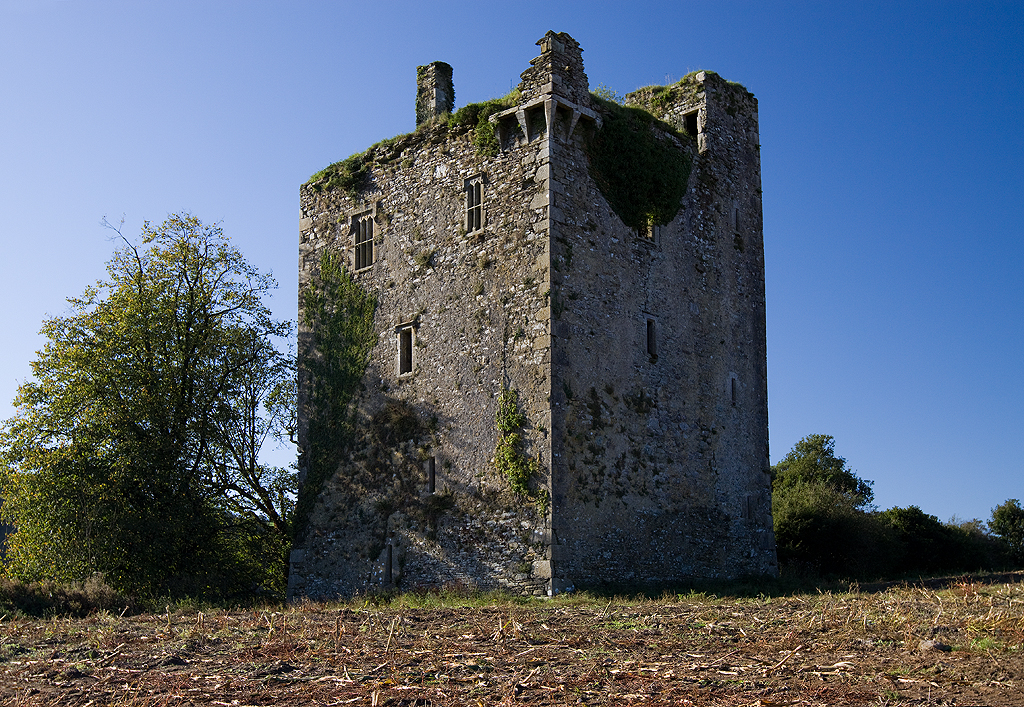
- Clodah Castle lies just south of the village

- Location in Ireland
- Coordinates: 51°50′34″N 08°49′56″W
- Country: Ireland
- Province: Munster
- County: County Cork
- Parish: Moviddy
- Elevation: 70 m (230 ft)

Population (2022)
  - Total: 183
- Time zone: UTC+0 (WET)
  - Summer (DST): UTC-1 (IST (WEST))
- Eircode (Routing Key): P14
- Irish Grid Reference: W420664

Crookstown (Irish: An Baile Gallda, meaning 'town of the invader or foreigner') is a small village in County Cork in Ireland, about 12 km east of the town of Macroom and about 1 km off the N22 Cork–Killarney road. It had a population of 183 at the 2022 census, down from 203 in the 2016 census.

== History ==
Historical population
Year	Pop.	±%
1991	353	—
1996	345	−2.3%
2002	320	−7.2%
2006	302	−5.6%
2011	222	−26.5%
2016	203	−8.6%
2022	183	−9.9%

To the south of Crookstown village is the ruin of the 16th century Clodagh Castle, once home to one of the branches of the McSweeney clan. Another ruined castle, Castlemore Castle or Dundrinan Castle, lies to the north of the village.

Crookstown Road railway station, located close to Castlemore Castle approximately 2 km from the village centre, operated as a stop on the Cork and Macroom Direct Railway from 1866 until services on the line ceased in the 1940s.

The Irish Republican Army (IRA) was active around Crookstown during the Irish War of Independence, and Crookstown House, an estate house owned by the Warren family was burnt-out by the IRA in June 1921. It was later rebuilt. According to biographer Tim Pat Coogan, Michael Collins was likely on his way to a meeting in Crookstown when he was killed in an ambush at nearby Béal na Bláth during the Irish Civil War.

== Geography ==
Crookstown is approximately 30 km from Cork City, and 4 km from Béal na Bláth. It lies between the River Bride and River Brouen, and in 2012 was subject to flooding when both rivers burst their banks.

== Economy ==
Crookstown is a rural village with a number of shops, pubs and other businesses.

A large mill, built c.1810 at Bellmount close to the village, was once economically important to the area. The area is now better known for its brick and concrete factory at Castlemore.

== Amenities ==
The Crookstown area is served by a Garda station and post office. Local sports clubs include Crookstown United (which fields teams in the Munster Football Association's 'shipping league') and Crookstown Karate Club (members of which have competed in national and international competition).

== See also ==
- List of towns and villages in Ireland
