= Bishopstown railway station =

Defunct railway station in Ireland

Bishopstown

General information
- Location: Bishopstown, County Cork; Ireland

History
- Original company: Cork and Macroom Direct Railway

Key dates
- 1 May 1912: Station opens
- 1 July 1921: Station closes

Bishopstown railway station was on the Cork and Macroom Direct Railway in County Cork, Ireland.

== History ==
The station opened on 1 May 1912. Regular passenger services were withdrawn on 1 July 1921.

== Routes ==
Preceding station	Disused railways	Following station
Cork Capwell	Cork and Macroom Direct Railway; Cork-Macroom	Ballincollig
