= Macroom railway station =

Station in County Cork, Ireland

Macroom

General information
- Location: Fitzgerald Street; Macroom, County Cork; Ireland

History
- Original company: Cork and Macroom Direct Railway
- Pre-grouping: Great Southern and Western Railway
- Post-grouping: Great Southern Railways

Key dates
- 12 May 1866: Station opens
- 1 July 1935: Station closes to passengers
- 11 November 1953: Station closes
Location

Macroom railway station was on the Cork and Macroom Direct Railway in County Cork, Ireland.

== History ==
The station opened on 12 May 1866. Regular passenger services were withdrawn on 1 July 1935. After costs of operating the railway became too high to maintain. The station closed to goods transport on 11 November 1953. This station was situated were the Macroom Bus Station and bus depot are today.

== Routes ==
| Preceding station | Disused railways | Following station |
|---|---|---|
| Dooniskey | Cork and Macroom Direct Railway; Cork-Macroom | Terminus |
