= Turners Cross, Cork =

Ward in Cork City, Ireland

Turners Cross Crois an Tornóra
- Town
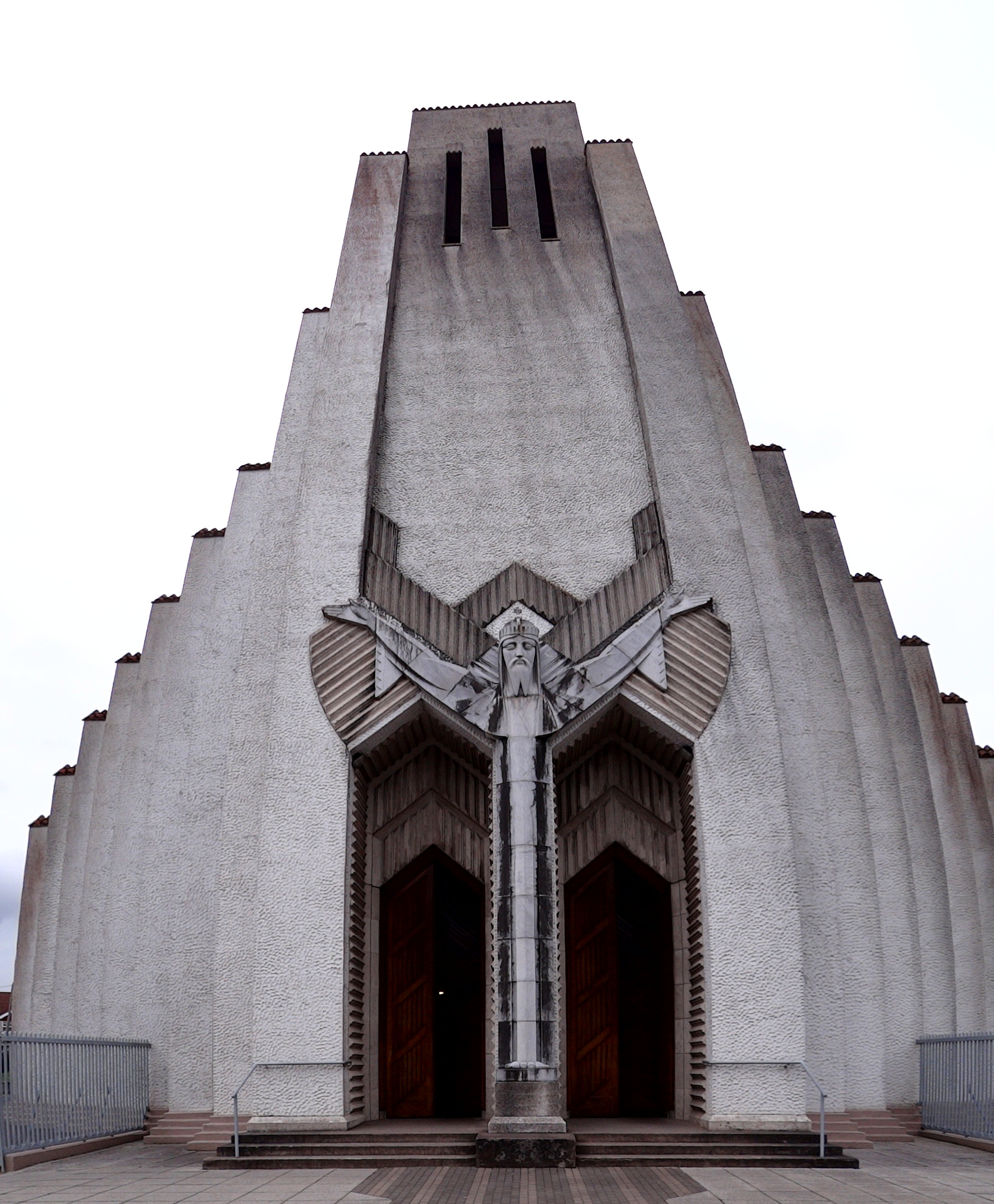
- The Church of Christ the King

- Location in Cork
- Coordinates: 51°53′10″N 8°27′51″W
- Country: Ireland
- Province: Munster
- Administrative area: Cork (city)
- Time zone: UTC+0 (WET)
  - Summer (DST): UTC-1 (IST (WEST))

Turners Cross (Irish: Crois an Tornóra) is a ward on the south side of Cork City in Ireland, and home to the Roman Catholic parish of the same name.

Largely residential, one of the key features of the area is the iconic church created by architect Barry Byrne and sculptor John Storrs, the Church of Christ the King. It was commissioned in 1927 by Daniel Cohalan, D.D., Lord Bishop of Cork. The church was the first Irish church to be built from concrete instead of brick, and is one of the largest suspended-ceiling churches in Europe. Opened in 1931, the church is based on the principles of Art Deco, which makes strong use of symmetric and geometric forms. Turners Cross is part of the Cork South-Central Dáil constituency.

== History ==
Rocque's map of Cork of 1759 is the first to show significant housing in the Turners Cross area in the areas that are now Evergreen Street (then Maypole Lane) and Quaker Road (then Graveyard Lane). Previous maps of Cork in 1690 and 1726 show only occasional houses associated with what were then farms on the southern edge of the city. The oldest housing still existing in Turners Cross now dates from the mid-19th century.

In 1879, the Cork and Macroom Direct Railway, which had shared the Cork, Bandon and South Coast Railway station at Albert Road in the city centre, moved its city terminus to a new station they created - Cork Capwell railway station in the Turners Cross area. This was used until 1925, when both the Cork and Macroom and Cork, Bandon and South Coast railways were merged into Great Southern Railways and the terminus reverted to Albert Road.

New housing was continually developed in the Turners Cross area until the 1950s, when there was little remaining spare land in the area.

One of the earliest large-scale developments was the Capwell Road housing scheme, built as part of Cork's post-Civil War municipal reconstruction. By February 1928 the scheme was complete, comprising 148 four-roomed houses arranged in short terraces of four units at a density of sixteen dwellings per acre. Proceeds from the Capwell scheme were subsequently applied to further housing development in Turners Cross and elsewhere in the city.

== Sport ==
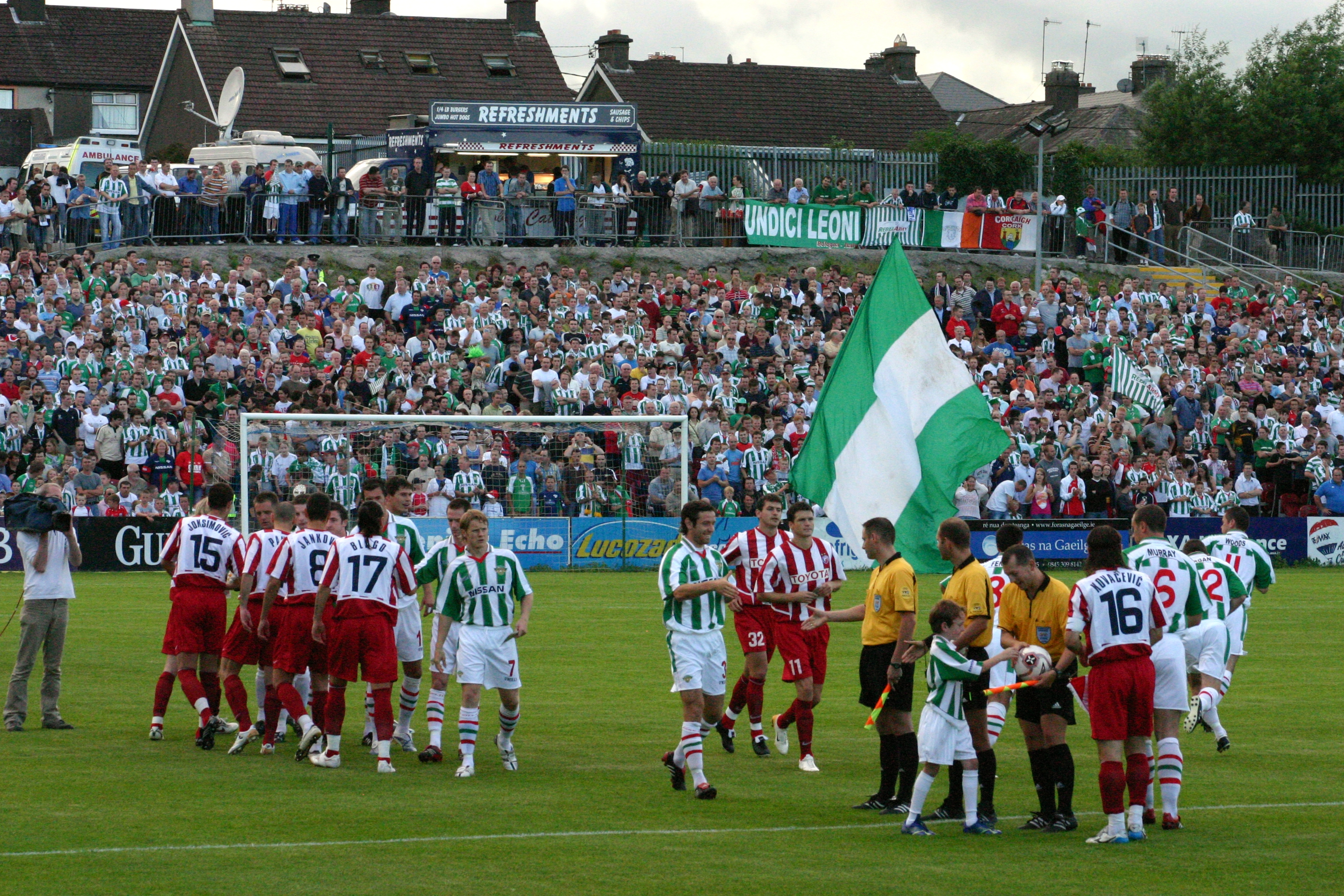
Cork City line out against Red Star Belgrade in a 2006 Champions League qualifier

Turners Cross is home to Cork City FC which is based in the Turners Cross Stadium.

Nearby there is also a rugby stadium, Musgrave Park, which is home to both Dolphin RFC and Sundays Well RFC. In addition, Musgrave Park is used for many home matches in the Pro14 tournament by Munster Rugby.

The local GAA club is Nemo Rangers, although they sold their grounds in Turners Cross for housing and relocated to a new location in nearby Douglas in 2007.

== Education ==
The main primary school in the area is Bunscoil Chríost Rí, which is a Catholic mixed (co-educational) school. The secondary schools in the area are Christ King, an all-girls school, which was originally served by the Presentation Sisters and Coláiste Chríost Rí, an all-boys school, which was served by the Presentation Brothers.

== Transport ==
=== Road ===
Turners Cross takes its name from an important junction, where the road from Cork to Kinsale separated from the road to Carrigaline. The road to Carrigaline (passing through Douglas) is now the R851.

The N27 dual-carriageway, which links Cork city centre to Cork Airport passes through Turners Cross. This handles the bulk of the traffic that used the road to Kinsale.

=== Bus ===
Several bus routes serve Turners Cross, including route 203 (from Farranree to Ballyphehane via Turners Cross), 206 (Grange to Cork city centre), 219 (Mahon to Bishopstown and MTU), and regional bus route 226 (Kent Station to Kinsale).

=== Rail ===
Although both the Cork-Macroom and Cork, Bandon and South Coast railways previously went through Turners Cross, it is not currently served by rail. The nearest active railway station is Cork Kent railway station.
