= Turners Cross =

Turners Cross may mean:

- Turners Cross (stadium), a football (soccer) ground in Cork, Ireland
- Turners Cross, Cork, a residential district and parish in Cork, Ireland
