= Trams in Galway =

Trams in Galway may refer to:

- Galway and Salthill Tramway (a system of trams that operated in Galway between 1879 and 1918)
- Proposed light rail developments for Galway City (a number of proposals for the reintroduction of a tram system in Galway since the 2000s)
