= Dooniskey railway station =

Railway station in Ireland

Coordinates: 51.8608°N 8.8874°W

Dooniskey
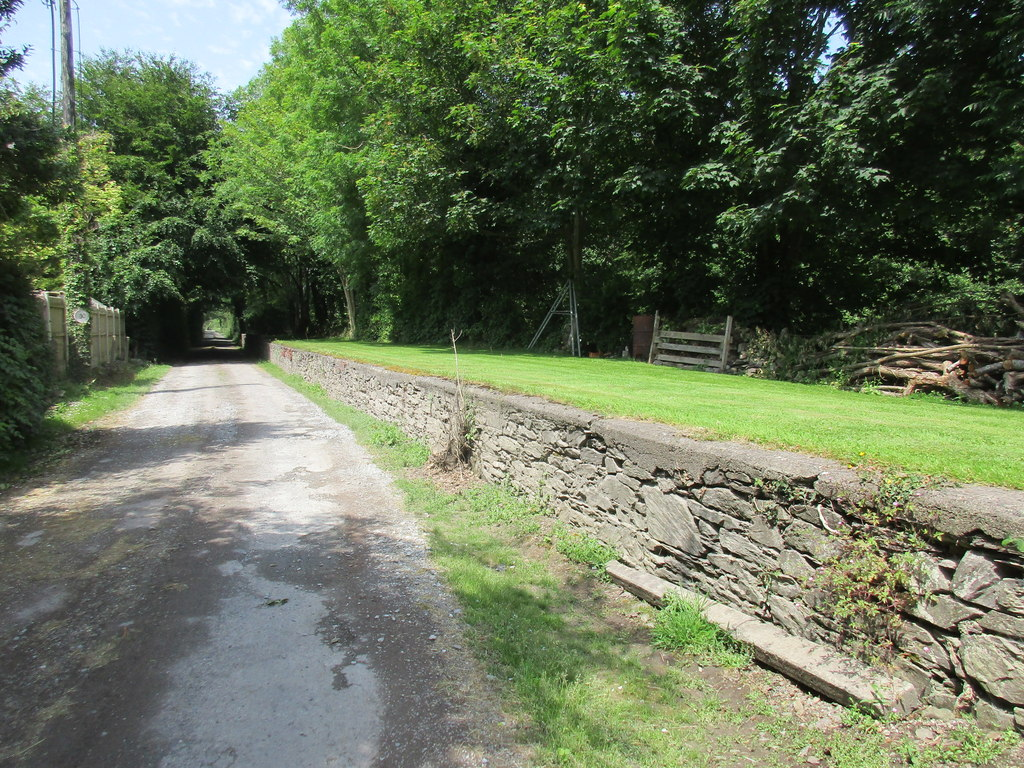
- The remains of Dooniskey station

General information
- Location: Dooniskey (Carrigdarrery); County Cork; Ireland

History
- Original company: Cork and Macroom Direct Railway
- Pre-grouping: Great Southern and Western Railway
- Post-grouping: Great Southern Railways

Key dates
- 12 May 1866: Station opens
- 1 July 1935: Station closes
Location

Dooniskey railway station was on the Cork and Macroom Direct Railway in County Cork, Ireland.

== History ==
The station opened on 12 May 1866. Regular passenger services were withdrawn on 1 July 1935.

== Routes ==
Preceding station	Disused railways	Following station
Crookstown Road	Cork and Macroom Direct Railway; Cork-Macroom	Macroom
