= Ballincollig Regional Park =

Park in County Cork, Ireland

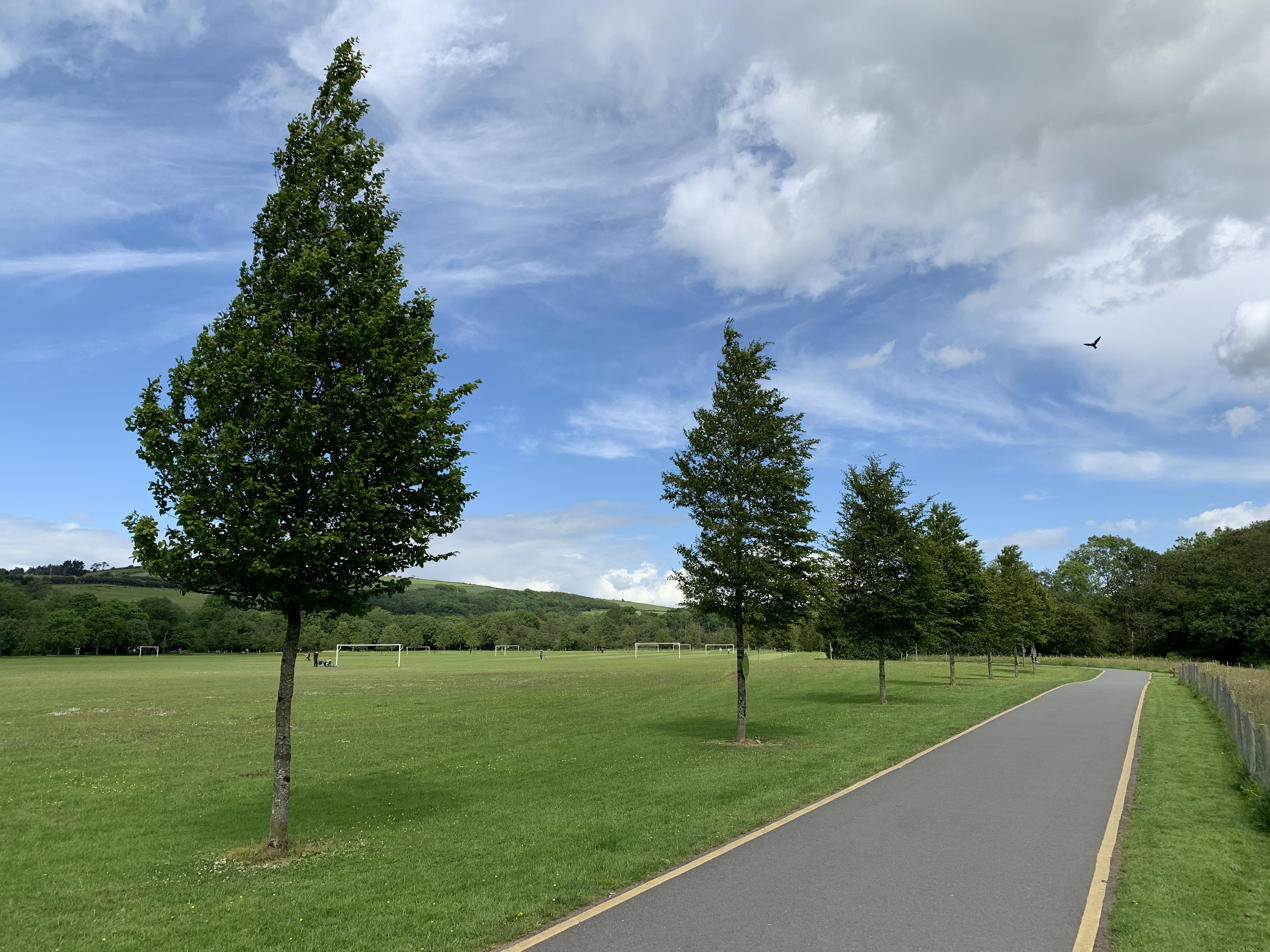
- Ballincollig Regional Park

- Location within Ireland
- Interactive map of Ballincollig Regional Park
- Type: Public park
- Location: Ballincollig, County Cork, Ireland
- Coordinates: 51.89289°N 8.60817°W
- Area: 55 hectares (135 acres)
- Created: 1985
- Operator: Cork City Council
- Status: Open year-round
- Website: www.corkcity.ie/en/cork-st-patricks-festival/tourism-attractions/ballincollig-regional-park-gunpowder-mills.html

Ballincollig Regional Park is a park in Ballincollig, County Cork, Ireland, created on the grounds of the former Ballincollig Royal Gunpowder Mills.

The park is approximately 55 hectares (135 acres) in area, with 52 structures in varying stages of decay surviving from the gunpowder manufacturing process. Most of the former gunpowder manufacturing was localized in the eastern part of the park, where ruins of the charcoal mill, saltpeter, and sulphur refineries can be seen. The western part is larger, and the buildings are sparser, with press house, granulating mill, and dusting house remaining.

The site is approximately 2.4 km (1.5 mi) in length and the River Lee runs the northern length of the site, creating a natural boundary of the park. The site contains a system of canals used during the manufacturing process connecting all the process areas in a single flat system without locks. The canals are fed from the River Lee at the western end of the site, and they were regraded and reformed in the late 1980 by the Cork City Council.

== Development ==
In 1974, the derelict Ballincollig Royal Gunpowder Mills site was purchased by Cork City Council, largely thanks to the efforts of historian George D. Kelleher to whom a plaque was dedicated in the park in 2008. Most of the tenders for the development of car parks, footbridges, footpaths, etc., and the job advertisement for park caretaker, were posted between 1987 and 1988.

In 1991, an international architectural design competition for the reception building at the Gunpowder Mills was won by Irish architects Tom de Paor and Emma O'Neill. The building went on to win awards from the Architectural Association of Ireland in 1993 and the Royal Institute of the Architects of Ireland in 1994.

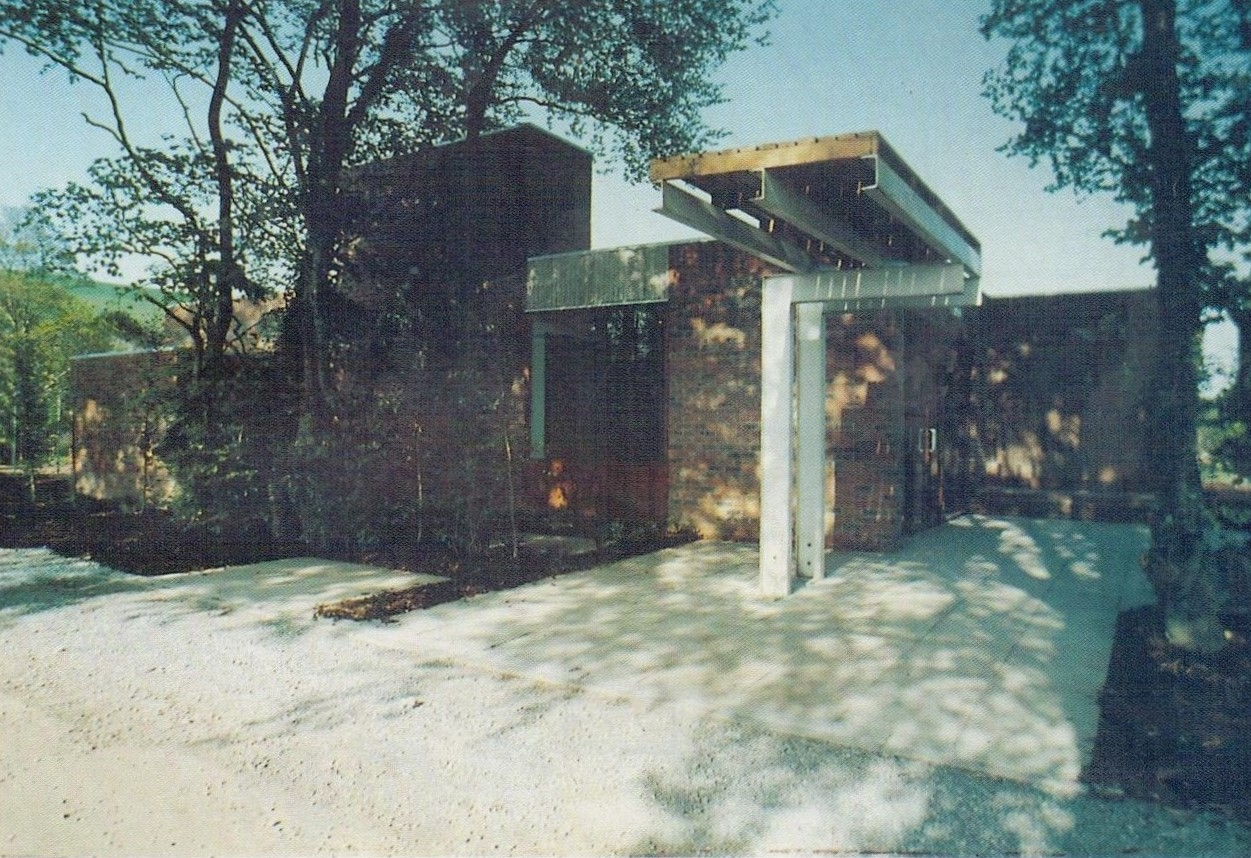
Gatehouse, Royal Gunpowder Mills, Ballincollig. (1993)

The park contains soccer pitches, a rugby pitch, walkways, a skateboard facility built at the cost of 170,000 euro, and free-to-use outdoor fitness equipment - the latter installed on the park's western end in November 2011. As a result of a 2012 development plan, which outlined the future of the Regional Park by the Recreation & Amenity section of the local authority, planning was approved for multi-use games areas and a children's playground. By 2019, the total of 1.4 million euro was spent on facilities. An 80-plot allotment scheme was also identified within the development plan, and was opened in November 2013 at the Innishmore entrance to the Regional Park.

A series of marked trails were laid-out in 2014, and consist of four looped walks, colour-coded according to length. The Military Trail begins at the Shopping Centre Square and continues to the Regional Park by a westerly route. Three other trails of varying lengths begin and end at the western end of the park at Inniscarra Bridge. The establishment of the trails included installing new signage and information maps.

In 2019, the park was extended to Fionn Laoi, an east Ballincollig area adjacent to the river. The development including installing a riverside walk and cycleway.

In 2021, many additional trees were planted throughout the park.

In 2024, a Little Free Library was installed close to the western entrance to the park.

== Use ==
In the 1990s, horse and pony races were organised on the park's grounds. Surveys as early as in 1992 documented high levels of satisfaction of the visitors. In 2018, estimated 660,000 visited the park. The location is used as a venue for social and sporting events, such as Parkrun and Heritage Week.

== Access ==
The park has four main entrances, with two at its western and eastern extremities, and two from the southern side. There are car parks near each entrance, with the largest ones by the two westernmost ones. In the late 2010s, public toilets and wheelchair-friendly parking spaces were added in these two car parks.
