= Killumney =

Village in County Cork, Ireland

Killumney Irish: Cill na hOmnaí
- Village
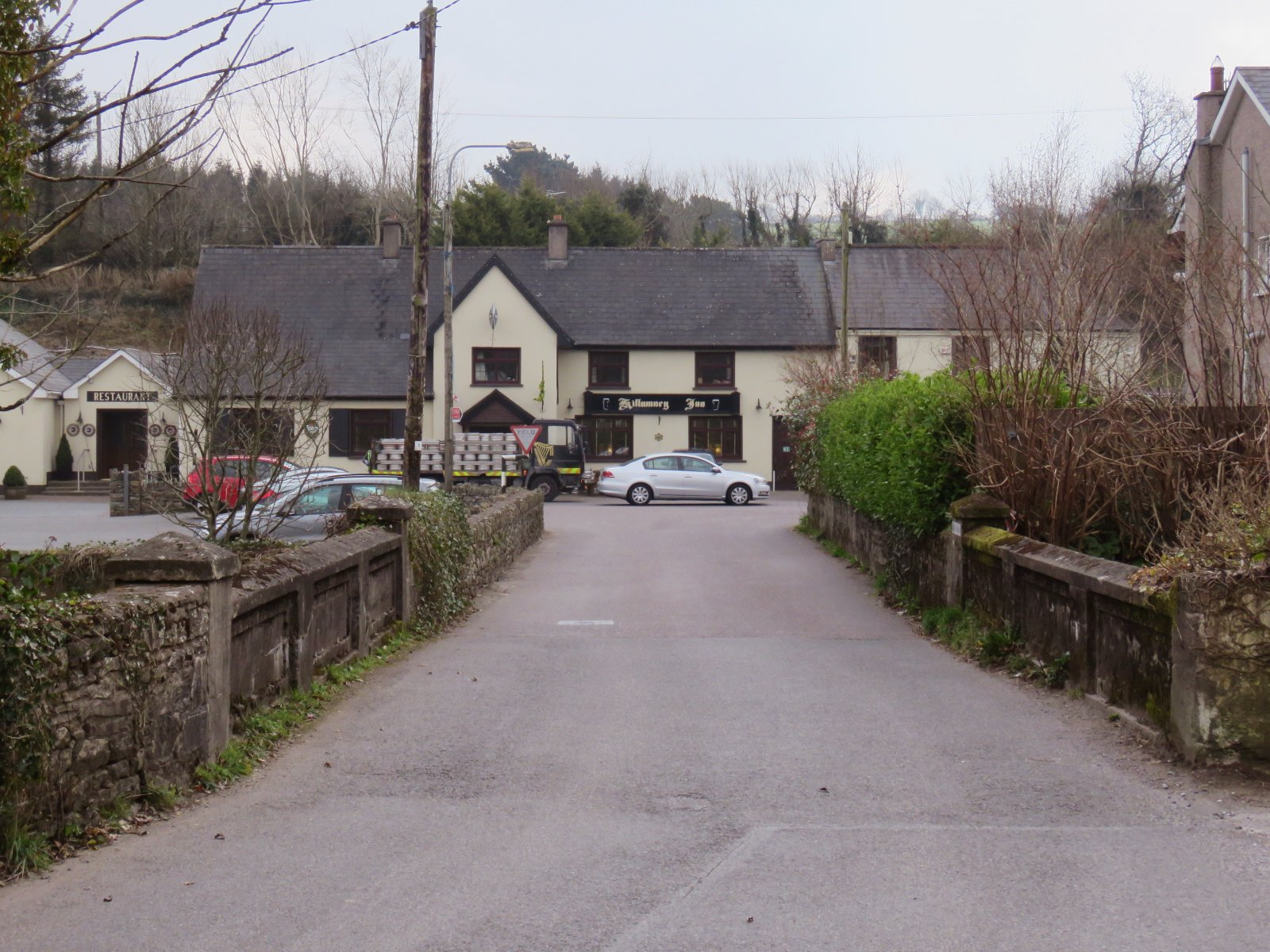
- Pub in Killumney

- Location in Ireland
- Coordinates: 51°52′05.99″N 08°39′32.30″W
- Country: Ireland
- Province: Munster
- County: County Cork

Population (2022)
  - Total: 1,466
- Time zone: UTC+0 (WET)
  - Summer (DST): UTC-1 (IST (WEST))

Killumney (Irish: Cill na hOmnaí) is a village in Ovens in County Cork, Ireland. The village is part of the Ovens/Farran Parish. Killumney is part of the Dáil constituency of Cork North-West.

There is a newsagent's shop, a pub, a Co-Op Store and a hair salon in the village. Dell EMC, a multi-national computer storage company, is based near Kilumney.

Kilumney was served by Kilumney railway station on the Cork-Macroom Railway from 1866 to 1953.

The N22 national primary road (Ballincollig bypass) links Kilumney to Cork City. The River Bride flows through the area.

The nearest school is Ovens National School, which had over 330 pupils as of 2013. The local soccer club is Killumney United FC.

== People ==
Bride Park Cottage in Killumney is the birthplace of Confederate Major General Patrick Cleburne, the highest-ranking Irishman to serve in the American Civil War.

== See also ==
- List of towns and villages in Ireland
