= Mycro Sportsgear =

- Company type: Private company limited by shares
- Industry: Manufacturing and retail
- Founded: 1986
- Headquarters: Ballincollig, Cork, Ireland

Mycro Sportsgear is a manufacturer and retailer of helmets and sliotars (balls) and other equipment used in the game of hurling. It was founded in the mid-1980s, and is based in Ballincollig in Ireland. As of 2010, when new Gaelic Athletic Association (GAA) rules made the wearing of helmets compulsory, Mycro Sportsgear was one of three manufacturers with helmets meeting the expected standard. Later, the company made the first helmet to pass the National Standards Authority of Ireland IS 355 safety standard for hurling helmets.
