= Cork gunpowder explosion =

1810 disaster in Cork, Ireland

Coordinates: 51.893°N 8.4845°W

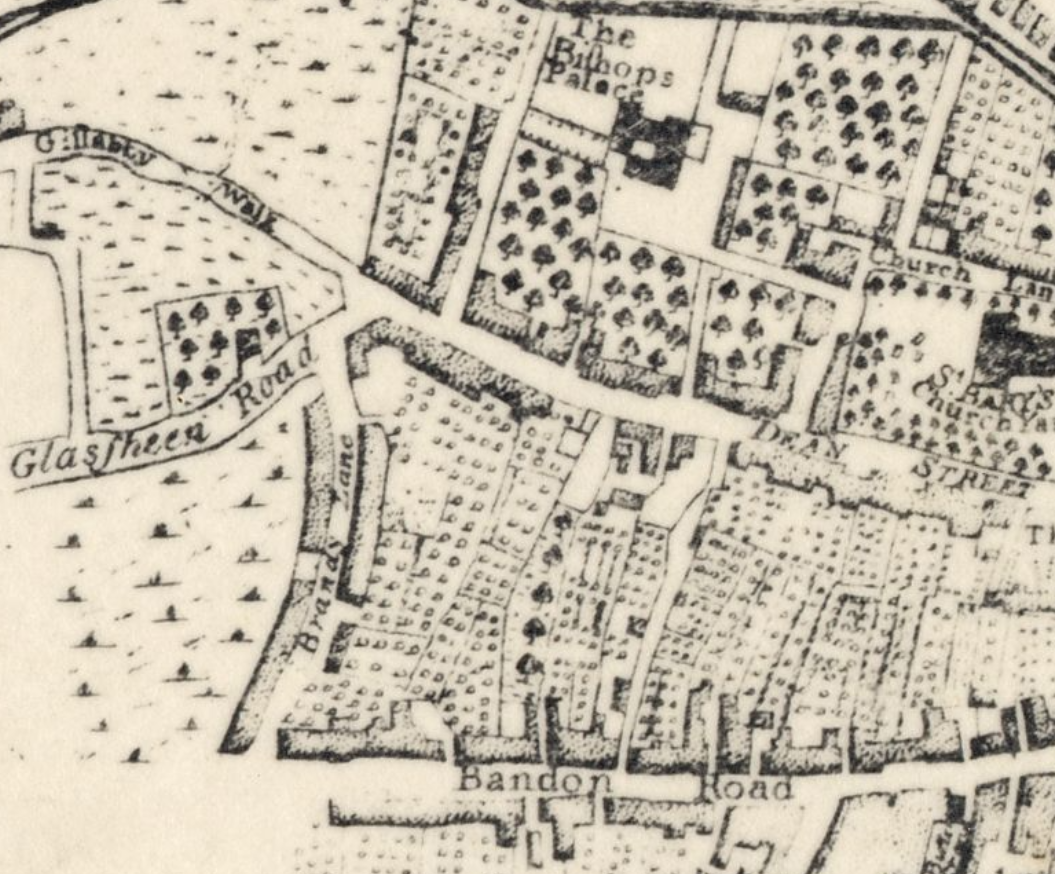
Detail of the Brandy Lane area, from a map published in 1774 by Joseph Connor (several decades prior to explosion)

The Cork gunpowder explosion was a large explosion that took place in Cork, Ireland, on 3 November 1810.

Twenty-two people were killed and over 40 injured when gunpowder stored in a labourer's house in Brandy Lane, Cork, exploded. A subsequent inquiry revealed that several employees of the Ballincollig Royal Gunpowder Mills (then the largest gunpowder manufacturing plant in the world), had been systematically stealing the material which was then sold on to quarrymen for rock blasting.

Figures compiled by the Gunpowder Works authorities showed that almost half a ton was unaccounted for in the nine-month period preceding the disaster.

During the course of the inquiry it was discovered that the illicit gunpowder had to be dried when brought to the house on Brandy Lane in the St Finbarr's area of the city. The method of drying reportedly involved a lit candle. In addition, one of the men involved on the night of the explosion, was seen drinking heavily in a local tavern.

A disaster fund was opened for the victims and their dependents to which over £12,000 was subscribed within two weeks.

== See also ==
- Dublin gunpowder explosion (1597)
