= Proposed light rail developments for Cork City =

Proposed transit system for Cork City, Ireland

Cork Light Rail

Overview
- Locale: Cork City
- Transit type: Tram (or Light rail)
- Number of lines: None (1 proposed)
- Website: http://www.luascork.ie

Since the early 2000s, a number of proposals have been made by politicians and interest groups in Cork City, Ireland to introduce a light rail system in the city. Sometimes referred to as Luas Cork, reflecting a comparison to the Luas light rail system in Dublin, one possible route was in a period of public consultation from April 2025. The proposed project has "no definitive timeline", but moved to a preliminary design phase in September 2026, with a railway order expected in late 2028.

== History ==
From the 1880s to 1934, a light rail system existed in Cork, the Cork and Muskerry Light Railway. It closed in 1934, having sustained damage during the Irish Civil War, which hindered usage. Another tramway operated three lines around the city center and surrounding suburbs, operated by the Cork Electric Tramways and Lighting Company. It closed in 1931.

A light rail system was proposed as part of the Green Party manifesto in 2007. When the Green Party entered into a coalition with Fianna Fáil, following the 2007 general election, these proposals were briefly discussed in the Dáil. In 2007 it was announced that a bus-based rapid transit system was to be examined in Cork City.

A 2008 update to the Cork Area Strategic Plan (CASP), developed jointly by Cork City Council and Cork County Council, included a suggested east-west "rapid-transit corridor" from Ballincollig to Mahon via the Cork docklands and city centre, as well as a north-south corridor from Ballyvolane to Cork Airport. This plan suggested that these would be serviced by buses, at least in the initial stages, but acknowledged that light rail or bus rapid transit might be justified depending on development. This update to the CASP was reflected in the 2009 Cork County Development Plan, which considered the transit corridors as being serviced by light rail or bus rapid transit. The 2015 City Development Plan only proposed developing the east-west corridor as a Bus Rapid Transit route.

A similar proposal was mentioned in the government's Ireland 2040 framework, which was published in 2018. As of 2019, a formal transportation plan for Cork, known as the Cork Metropolitan Area Transport Strategy (CMATS), was prepared by the local authority. Publication was scheduled for February 2018, with a "draft plan" proposed to be available for "public consultation early in 2019". The draft CMATS plan was published in May 2019, and included draft proposals for the construction of a light-rail system sometime after 2031.

== Proposed routes ==
Plans proposed in 2017, under the Ireland 2040 development framework, had suggested an 'east-west' light-rail corridor from Ballincollig in the west of Cork City, through the city centre, to Mahon in the east. A 'north-south' corridor was also contained in these plans, linking Cork Airport.

During 2018, the People Before Profit (PBP) political party proposed a number of variants of these routes. A multi-line proposal suggested a line running from Ballincollig to Mahon, and another from Cork Airport to Cork city center.

In May 2019, the Cork Metropolitan Area Transport Strategy was published by the National Transport Authority (NTA), and contained proposals for a one-line system running from Ballincollig to Mahon, with stops at points in the city centre. The design was unveiled alongside a number of other suggested transport investments, including an expansion of the Cork Suburban Rail network. The 2019 proposal was costed at €1 billion, projected to include 25 possible stops along 17 km of track. Determination of a possible light rail transit (LRT) route was due to start in early 2020, with construction not expected to commence "until 2031 at earliest". These 2019 proposals speculated that the line would make use of the old Cork, Blackrock and Passage Railway line greenway when running through Blackrock. In July 2020, updated CMATS plans were released.

While a preferred route for the proposed LRT line was projected to be identified by 2022, as of October 2023, its publication was reported as having been "delayed intentionally".

An "emerging preferred route" (costed at between €2 billion and €3 billion) was published for public consultation in April 2025. A version of this proposal, including "significant changes to the earlier emerging preferred route", was published in mid-April 2026. The updated route included land belonging to both Bishopstown GAA and Highfield rugby clubs.

== See also ==
- Proposed light rail developments for Galway City
