= Murphy Barracks =

- Dún Ui Mhurchadha
- Ballincollig, County Cork
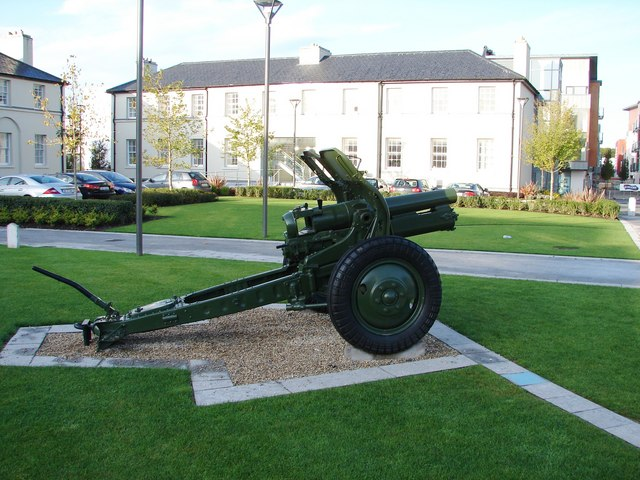
- Barracks Square

Site information
- Type: Barracks
- Operator: (Republic of Ireland) Irish Army

Location
- Location within Ireland
- Coordinates: 51.8890°N 8.5878°W

Site history
- Built: 1810
- Built for: War Office
- In use: 1810–1998

Garrison information
- Garrison: Royal Field Artillery

Murphy Barracks, also known as Ballincollig Barracks, was a military installation in Ballincollig, County Cork in Ireland. Built in the early 19th century, the barracks closed in 1998.

== History ==
The barracks were commissioned for use by units of the Royal Field Artillery in 1810. They were laid out around a quadrangle with the officers' mess on the eastern side and a hospital on the western side. Their function was to protect the Ballincollig Royal Gunpowder Mills and, although the mills closed in 1903, British artillery regiments remained there well into the 20th century.

After the barracks were secured by the forces of the Irish Free State in 1922, the barracks were occupied by the 1st Field Regiment of the Irish Army. In 1940, the installation was renamed Murphy Barracks to commemorate the life of Walter Leo Murphy, Commander of the 3rd Battalion, 1st Cork Brigade of the Irish Republican Army, who had been killed by soldiers of the Manchester Regiment in June 1921.

The barracks closed in 1998, and the 97 acres (39 ha) site was sold to a developer, O'Flynn Construction, for €41 million in 2003. The parade ground became known as Barracks Square and the surrounding buildings were converted for office, retail and leisure use.

== See also ==
- List of Irish military installations
