= Proposed light rail developments for Galway City =

Galway Light Rail

Overview
- Locale: Galway City
- Transit type: Tram (or Light rail)
- Number of lines: None (1 proposed)

Since the early 2000s, a number of proposals have been made by politicians and interest groups in Galway to introduce a light rail system in the city. No light rail proposal for the city has received any government support to date.

== Proposals ==
=== Corrib Light Rail (2006) ===
A light rail proposal, made in early 2006, was dubbed the Corrib Light Rail. In mid-2006, the Minister for Transport, Martin Cullen, stated that the Galway Transportation and Planning Study did not "envisage light rail measures such as those outlined in the Corrib Light Rail submission". The proposal was not progressed.

=== Gluas (2008) ===
Gluas (the Irish word for "movement", and a pun on "Galway" + "Luas") was a proposed tram or light rail system for Galway city, similar to the Luas found in Dublin. Proposed by a Galway-based lobby group, it included three possible routes:

- Line 1: Ballybrit -> Mervue -> Wellpark -> Eyre Square -> Nun's Island -> Newcastle -> Dangan -> Rahoon
- Line 2: Eyre Square -> Newcastle -> Shantalla -> Taylors Hill -> Barna
- Line 3: Murrouoh -> Renmore -> Wellpark -> Terryland -> Newcastle -> Shantalla -> Taylors Hill

A fourth line was also proposed:

- Line 4: Eyre Square -> Claddagh -> Salthill -> Knocknacarra

The three-line proposal, projected the construction of 64 stations, with park and ride facilities at Knocknacarra and Dangan. At the time the project was proposed, in June 2008, it was suggested that it could be completed within three years.

The project's supporters appealed to Galway City Council to consider funding the project in 2015, and again in 2017. The project was not progressed.

=== Gluas (2021) ===
In April 2021, the Gluas Group held a webinar in which Minister for Transport Eamon Ryan announced a feasibility study on light rail for 2022. A feasibility study, commissioned by the National Transport Authority and published in October 2024, found that there was a case for constructing a fifteen-kilometre light rail line from Roscam to Knocknacarra via Eyre Square and University Hospital Galway. The study included options involving both conventional Light Railway Transit and Very Light Rail.

== See also ==
- Ceannt station, Galway city's main railway station
- Western Railway Corridor, the partially disused rail corridor linking Limerick, Galway and Sligo
- Dublin–Westport/Galway railway line, the east west line from Galway to Dublin, with a branch connecting to Westport
- Proposed light rail developments for Cork City
