= Ballincollig railway station =

Closed station in County Cork, Ireland

Ballincollig

General information
- Location: Station Rd. Ballincollig, County Cork; Ireland
- Coordinates: 51.88270°N 8.5893°W
- Platforms: 1
- Tracks: 1

History
- Opened: 12 May 1866
- Closed: 1 July 1935
- Original company: Cork and Macroom Direct Railway
- Post-grouping: Great Southern Railways

Services
Preceding station	Cork and Macroom Direct Railway	Following station
Cork Albert Quay	Cork-Macroom 1866-1879	Kilumney
Bishopstown	Cork-Macroom 1879-1927	Kilumney
Cork Albert Quay	Cork-Macroom 1927-1935	Kilumney
Location

Ballincollig railway station was on the Cork and Macroom Direct Railway in County Cork, Ireland.

== History ==
The station opened on 12 May 1866. Regular passenger services were withdrawn on 1 July 1935.
