= Cork Capwell railway station =

Railway station in County Cork, Ireland

Cork Capwell

General information
- Location: Cork, County Cork; Ireland
- Coordinates: 51.891°N 8.468°W

History
- Original company: Cork and Macroom Direct Railway
- Pre-grouping: Great Southern and Western Railway
- Post-grouping: Great Southern Railways

Key dates
- 30 September 1879: Station opened
- 2 March 1925: Station closed
Location

Cork Capwell railway station was the terminus of the Cork and Macroom Direct Railway (CMDR) in County Cork, Ireland. It was located just off the Summerhill South Road and the station building remains in use by Bus Éireann as offices.

== History ==
The station opened on 30 September 1879. Regular passenger services were withdrawn on 2 March 1925.

== Routes ==
| Preceding station | Disused railways | Following station |
|---|---|---|
| Terminus | Cork and Macroom Direct Railway; Cork-Macroom | Bishopstown |
