= Ballincollig Royal Gunpowder Mills =

Ruined powder mills in Cork City, Ireland

Coordinates: 51.893°N 8.590°W

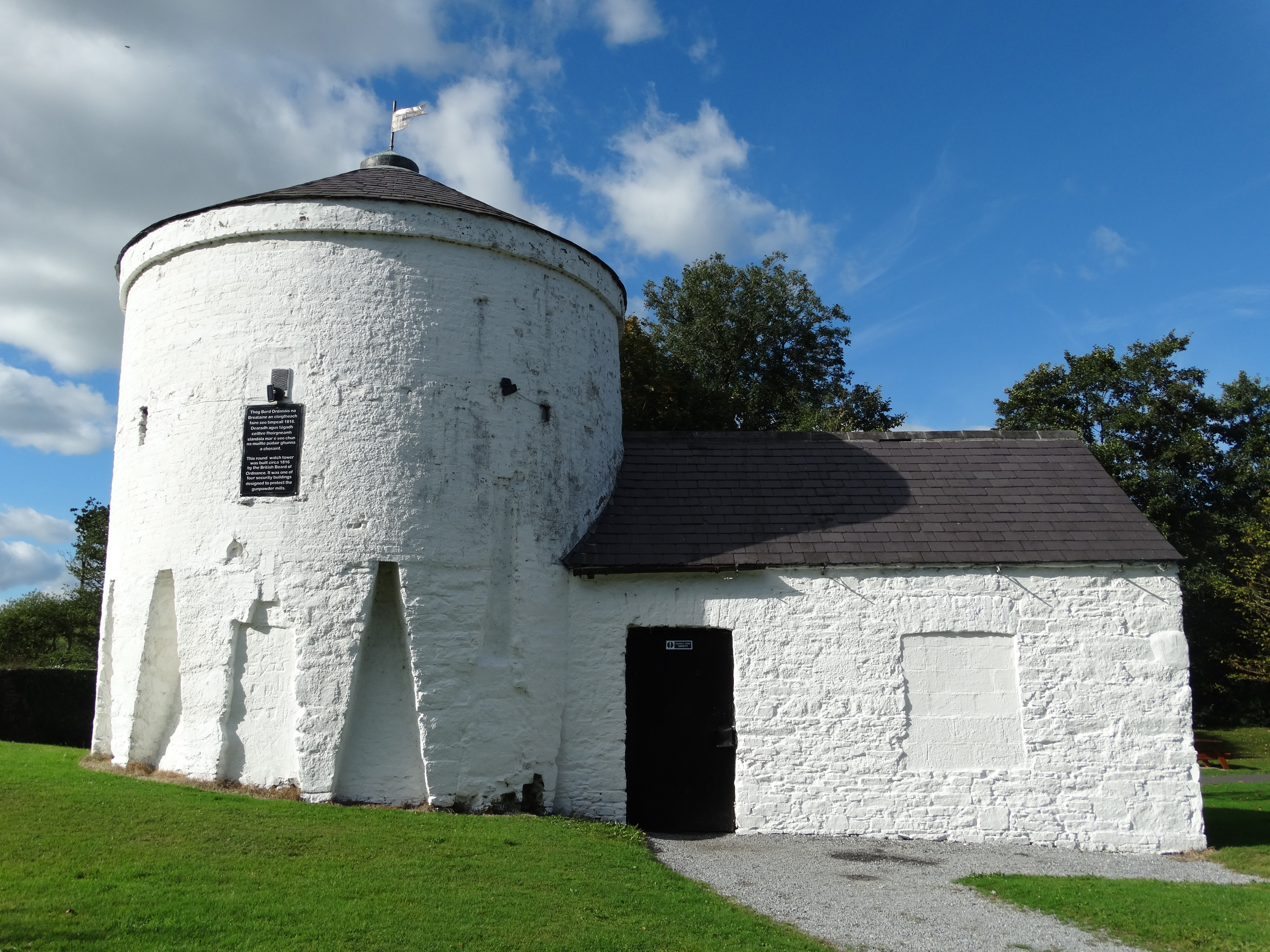
- Former Watch House and Search Room, Ballincollig Mills

Gunpowder
- Current status: Ruined

Construction
- Built: 1794

The Ballincollig Royal Gunpowder Mills was one of three Royal gunpowder mills that manufactured gunpowder for the British Government. Located in Ballincollig, Cork city, Ireland, largely in what is now the Ballincollig Regional Park, the powder mills were originally opened in 1794 as a private enterprise, before being taken over by the British Government during the Napoleonic Wars.

The mills returned for a time to private ownership in the mid-19th century, before closing permanently in 1903. In the late 20th century Cork County Council bought the mill grounds, developed a public park and opened a visitor centre. Though the visitor centre closed in 2002, many of the mill buildings remain accessible in the public park.

== Operational history (1794 – 1903) ==
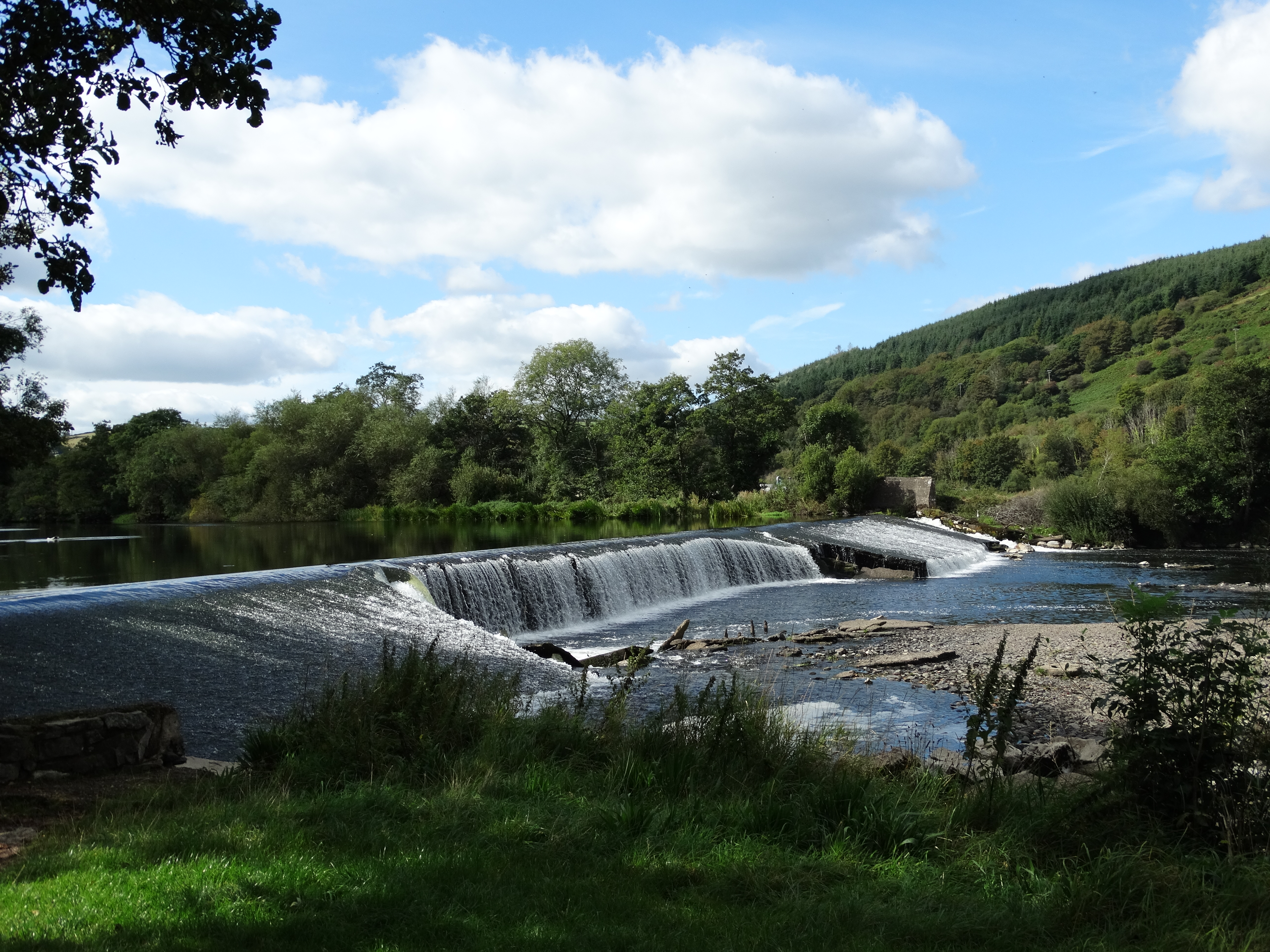
Weir, built in 1795

=== Background ===
Prior to the formation of the Royal Gunpowder Mills, gunpowder production was centered in Dublin on tributaries to the Liffey, in particular the River Carmac where three gunpowder factories had been established in the late 18th century.

=== Formation ===
The gunpowder mills were first established in Ballincollig in 1794, by Corkman Charles Henry Leslie alongside his silent partner John Travers, trading under the name of Leslie, Travers and Company, Royal Irish Gunpowder Mills. He chose Ballincollig as a site for the gunpowder factory for several reasons: from a safety perspective, it was relatively remote at the time, far from any well-populated areas; on the other hand, it was close enough to Cork city to avail of its port to facilitate the importation of the raw materials required for the production of gunpowder. Furthermore, its location in a flat valley and its water-power potential influenced Leslie's choice of Ballincollig as the ideal site. Leslie built a weir to produce a head of water and a canal, one and a half miles long which was fed by the River Lee and which powered his two mills at the eastern end of the site. For the first twenty years following their construction, the mills were the largest in Ireland, and second largest in Europe after Waltham Abbey. To ensure sufficient water supply, three existing River Lee channels were merged into one near the old Inniscarra graveyard which resulted in later flooding of the area.

Following the 1798 Rebellion and the emerging threat from Napoleon, the British government deemed it vital to seek out a monopoly on gunpowder production in Ireland. In 1804, Leslie bought out Travers' share of the mills, and either in that same year or in 1805, he sold the mills on a lease of 999 years to the British Board of Ordnance for a sum of IR£30,000. To meet the demands of the British Army, during the Napoleonic Wars the mill site was expanded tenfold and twelve new mills were added to the complex as well as new processing buildings and homes for the workers and senior officials. To improve security, Ballincollig Barracks was constructed in 1810, and military escorts were arranged to accompany the wagons of powder to Cork Harbour. The site covered 435 acres (1.76 km^{2}), and was enclosed by a high limestone wall.

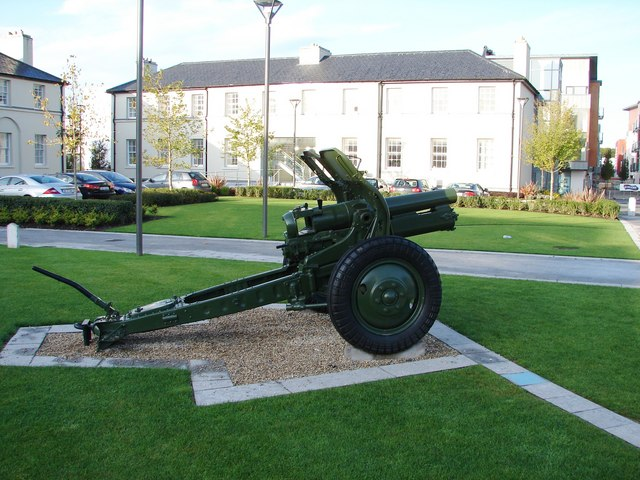
Part of the surviving 1810 barracks complex

After the Napoleonic Wars, the demand for gunpowder fell dramatically and the mills were closed in 1815. The Duke of Wellington ordered "The whole of the wooden part of the manufactory to be taken down (and) the foundations to be preserved". The machinery was oiled, painted and maintained. Some of the equipment was put up for auction in 1831 and soon many of the buildings were in dilapidated state.

=== Re-opening as a private company ===
In early 1830s the mills were acquired by Sir John Tobin and Company of Liverpool for £15,000. Tobin and his partner Charles Horsfall transformed the mills into one of the most up to date industries in the country.

Within a few months the complex was being renovated and workers were employed at clearing out the disused waterways. By mid-1835 at the Ballincollig mills, trading as the Royal Gunpowder Mills Company, had commenced the manufacture and the weekly wage bill was almost 200 pounds. Before the end of the 1830s there were about 200 people employed at the mills and the annual production of gunpowder was in the region of 16,000 barrels. To reduce the danger of accidents the various departments were placed at some distance from each other; materials were transported on small canals which eliminated the hazard of sparks from horses hooves. The quantities of gunpowder exported between 1836 and 1842 were : 1836 – 7,517 casks; 1837 – 6,267 casks, 1838 – 9,835 casks; 1839 – 16,045 casks; 1840 – 13,914 casks; 1841 – 16,489 casks; 1842 – 17,738 casks. Having such quantities of gunpowder passing through the city gave cause for alarm and in June 1842 the matter was discussed by the Harbour Board. It was agreed that great caution should be exercised while shipping the material and it was suggested that the shipping point be moved from the navigation wall down river to Rochestown. It was later suggested that new road to be constructed to transport the gunpowder from Ballincollig to Cork, and a plan to build a canal was also suggested.

Ballincollig continued to grow into the middle of the nineteenth century, even while famine raged in other parts of the island, and the mills became one of the largest industrial establishments in the Cork area. At this time about 500 men and boys were employed and a range of skills were in use in the mills: coopering, mill-wrighting, carpentry as well as other specialist gunpowder making skills. The population of Ballincollig, in 1886, from the Postal Directory of Munster, was 1,130 (including the military).

The powder at this time was largely blasting powder to meet the demands of the construction of new railways, mining and quarrying.

== Trades ==
The manufacture of gunpowder involved many skills. The trades mentioned in the board of ordnance list of 1815 included the following: carpenter, cooper, millwright, master mixer, refiners of brimstone (sulphur), charcoal, and saltpetre, press-house, corning house, glazing house, dusting house men, sawyer, shave cleaver.

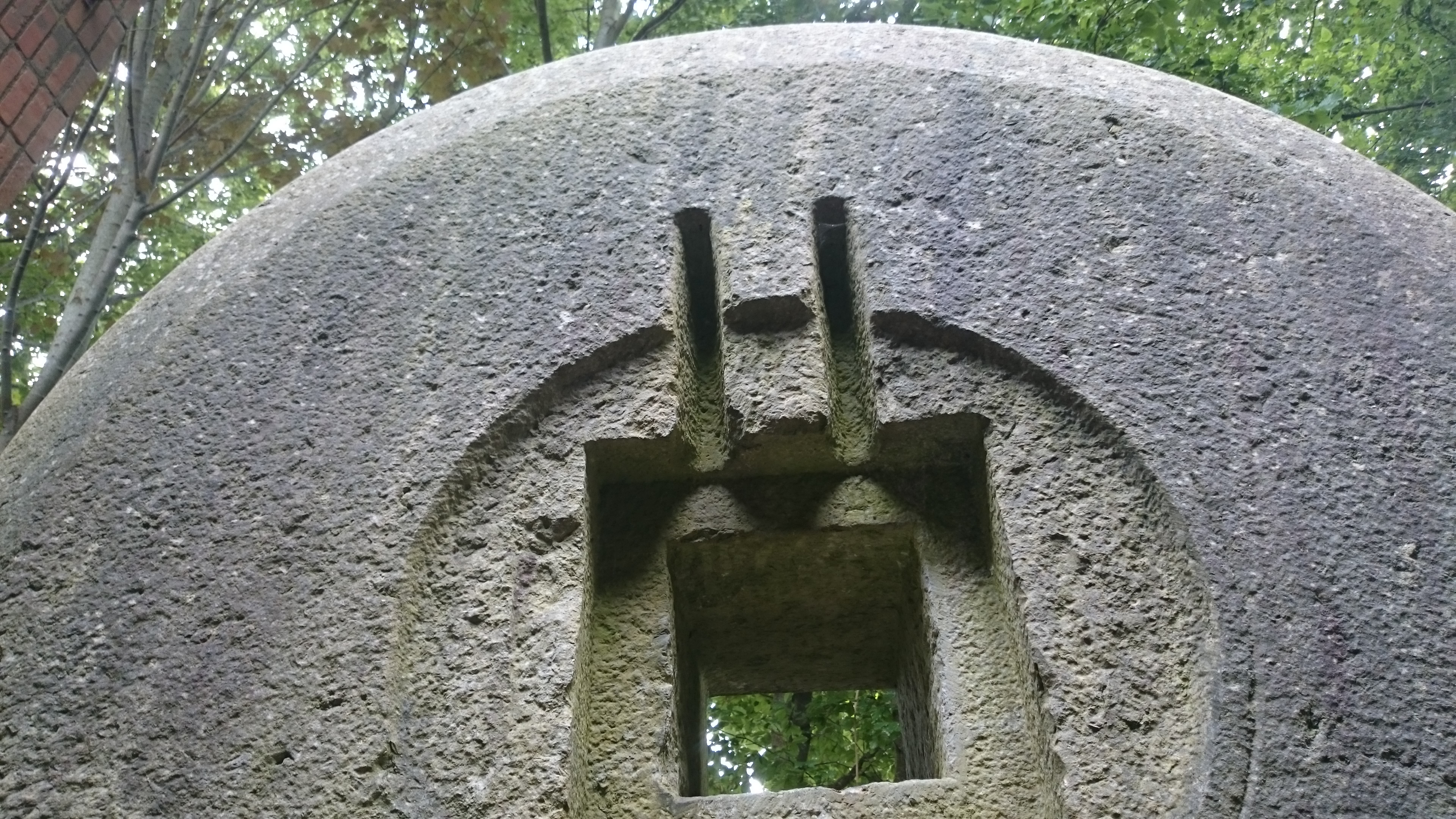
Surviving mill stone on the site

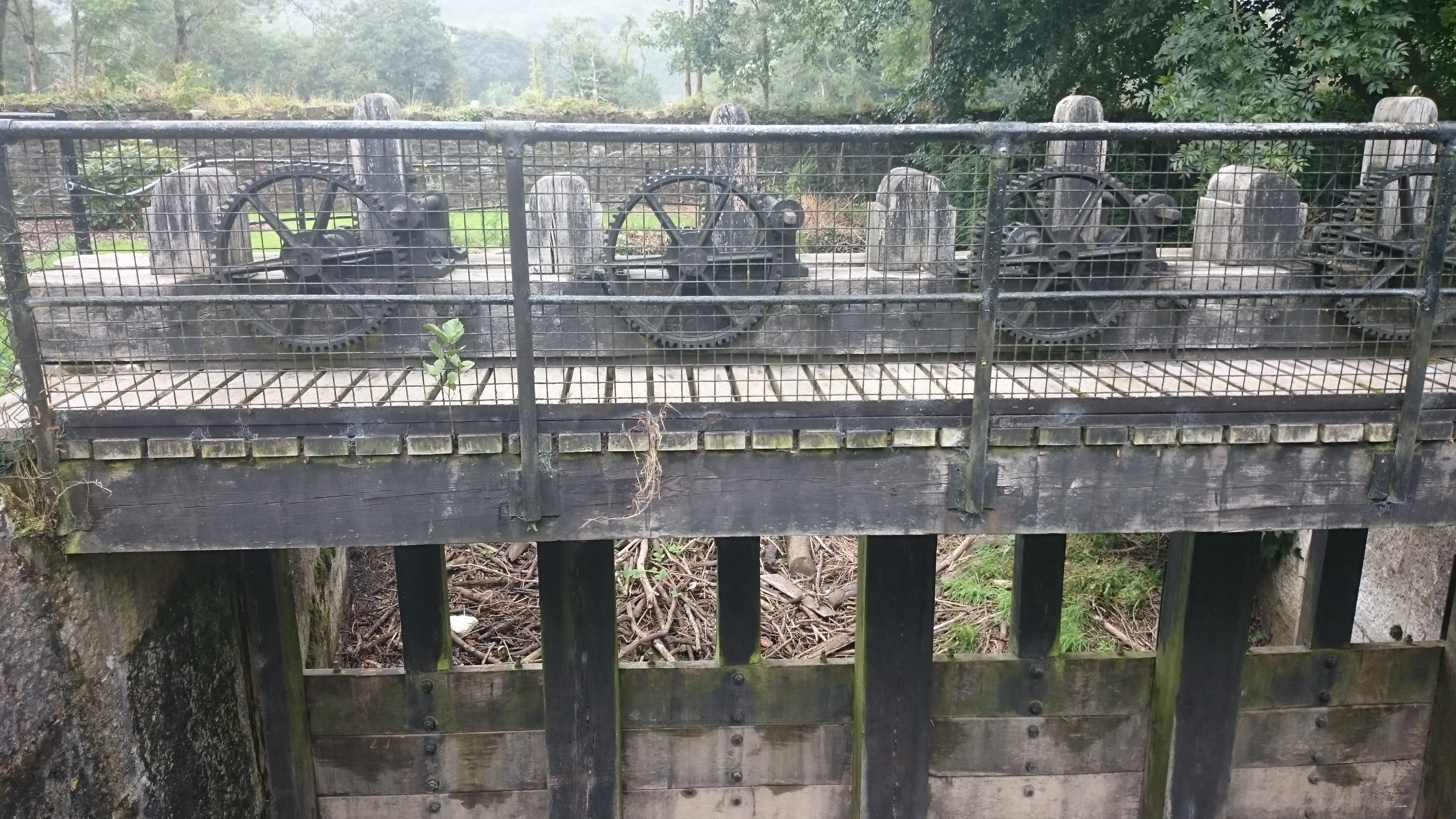
Sluice gates at Ballincollig

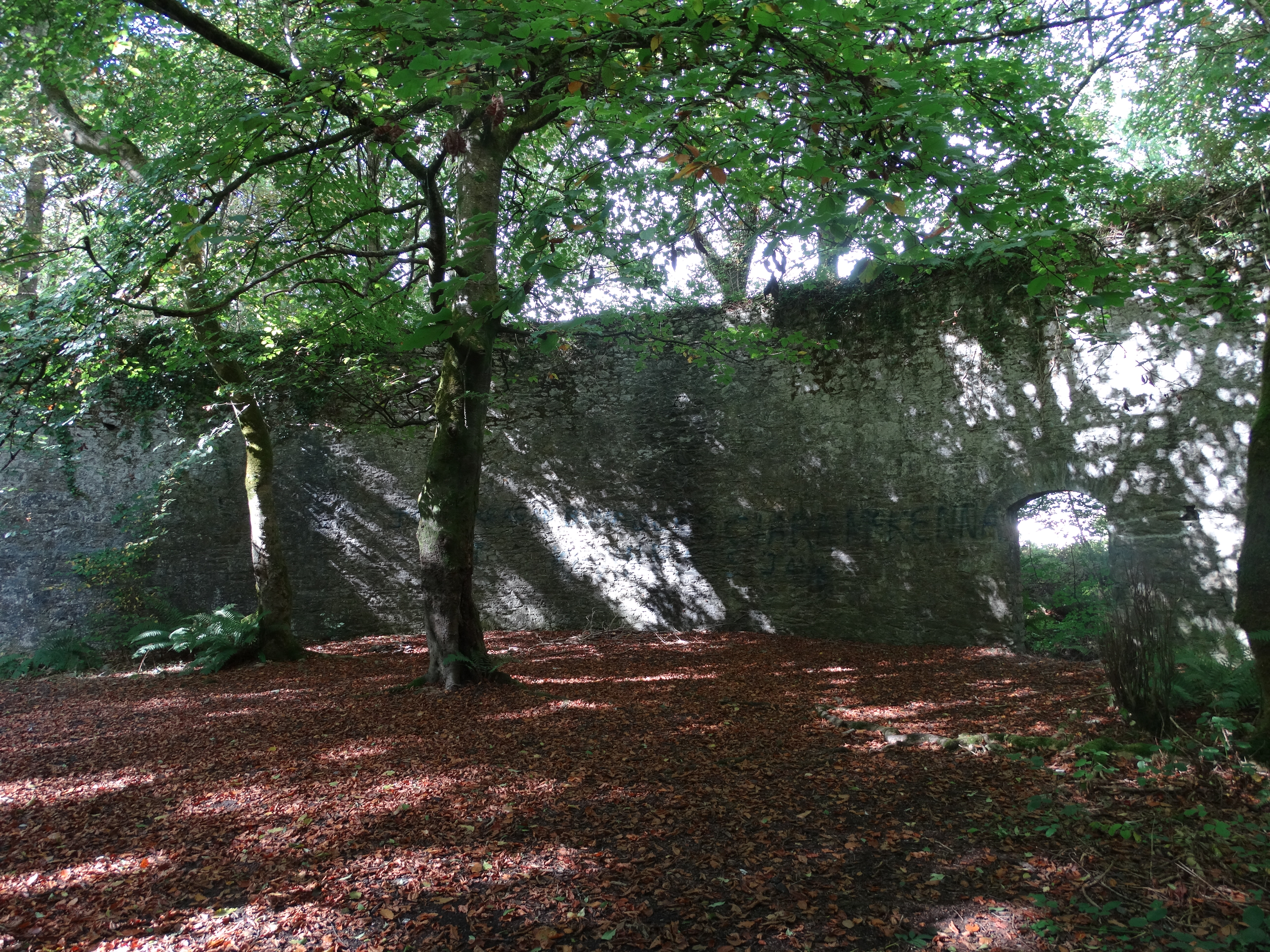
A large circular coal store, since overgrown

=== Coopers ===
==== Role and training ====
Coopering involved the making of barrels or casks of staves that were bound together by hoops of copper or wood. They were fitted with a head and bottom. The barrels were made of oak and had to be fitted extra tight so that dampness would not seep into the powder when it was stored. Copper nails were used. In the late 1830s, around 16,000 barrels of gunpowder were produced each year in Ballincollig. By 1856 there were about 50 coopers and apprentices employed in the mills.

Coopers had to undergo a five-year apprenticeship. The apprentices had to be at least fourteen years of age and to be able to read and write. Their training was governed by the rules of the Cork Coopers Society. They usually worked from 6am to 6pm in summer and from light to dark in winter. In 1887 all boys in the society in the second of their time had to pay 2d (1p) per week until the end of their apprenticeship. Many of the Ballincollig coopers had sons in the trade with them.

==== Decline ====
From the 1870s, the number of coopers in the Ballincollig Powder Mills declined. Some of this was due to the decline of production, but some was due to the use of metal canisters to hold powder as the mills changed their production to sporting powders. Some of the decline was also due to the importation of barrels from Royal Arsenal, Woolwich.

After a temporary problem in the summer of 1886, when the mills were closed to the lack of water, there was a general distress in 1889 amongst the powder mill workers, but the coopers were particularly hard hit. "All the coopers are idle for a considerable period; several have gone to England… the remainder…are watching every chance that may turn up to give them employment… but they cannot succeed.

The difficulties the coopers experience lead to industrial trouble. In 1892, the coopers were in dispute with the management over the importation of powder barrels which meant that for the previous 3 months coopers were only able to earn twelve shillings a week.

In 1886, the coopers were again in dispute over the introduction of new machinery which would cut their "already low wages" by 33 per cent. When they refused to accept the managers terms they went out on strike. Eventually, the manager agreed to take back all but three who were regarded as ringleaders, who should be suspended for some time at least as "an example". The company threatened the closure of the cooperage and the use of machine made casks. There was a general decline in coopering in Cork at the end of the last century so that efforts to get the permission of the Cork coopers society to try to find work in the city were in vain.

As a result of the decline in demand for coopering, coopers and their families started to emigrate to England in 1889. Some went to find work in England and Scotland. Others found work elsewhere in Ireland, at least temporarily. In 1886 the Cork Coopers were not pleased when they heard that Ballincollig coopers had found work in Limerick. When the Powder Mills finally closed in June 1903, coopers still appealed to the coopers society to allow them to find work in Cork City, but the society refused.

== Manufacturing hazards ==
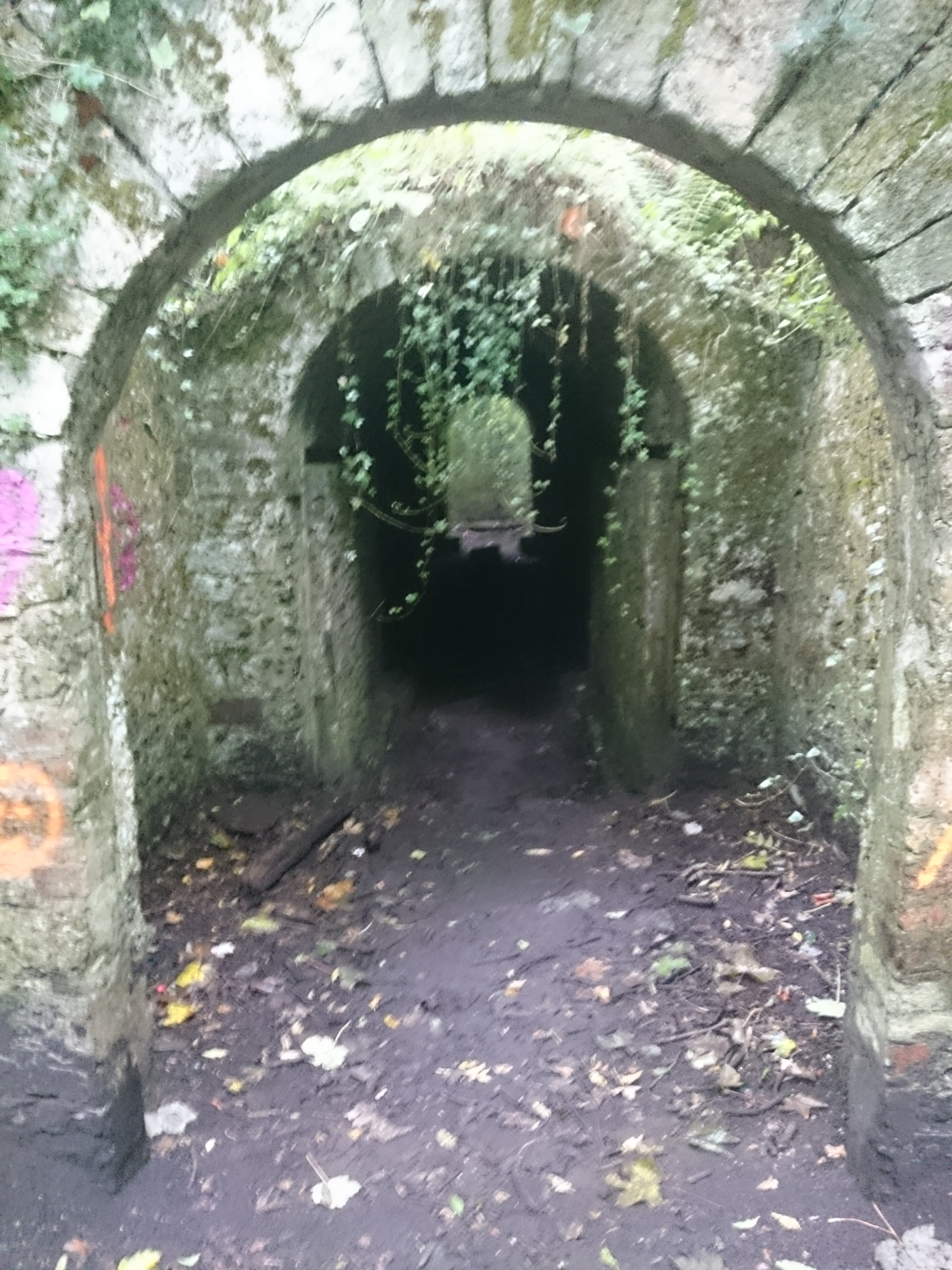
Vaulted magazine for storage

During the nineteenth century the manufacture of gunpowder at Ballincollig, and its transportation through Cork City, caused much concern and some fatal accidents. From the opening years of the century the hazards associated with transporting such a hazardous substance through busy streets were evident.

Multiple explosions occurred at the gunpowder mills, including:

- Explosion on 25 June 1841 with two fatalities
- Very large explosion on 29 July 1843 with two fatalities (John Carol and Jeremiah Long) in the corning mill
- Mill explosion in 1846 with two men injured
- Fire on 15 April 1847 which reduced the cooperage to ashes
- Explosion of a small mill in June 1858 with no injuries reported
- Explosion in the dusting house in August 1859 which killed five men (Timothy Burns, John Corcoran, William Looney, Timothy Lyons and James Merrick)

A more melancholy sight then this could not be imagined, surrounded as if it were relatives of the deceased, bewailing their fate with loud and incessant lamentations; but it was horrible in the extreme to see from time to time persons coming in, bringing in, wrapped in grass or cloth, a blackened cinder that was once a hand, a foot, or other portions of one of the dead men. Those awful relics were scattered far and wide, some of them having been found on the brow of the hill on the opposite side of the river, nearly half a mile away from the scene of the catastrophe.

- Explosion in the pressing mill on 23 October 1861 which killed five (Owen Begley, Thomas Long, George Davidson, Thomas Hailey and Timothy Merrick)
- Explosion in the drying house ("west stove") on 25 October 1862 with two fatalities (John Hallissy and David Leahy)
- Explosion in one of the composition mills on 22 January 1864
- Explosion in compounding sheds on 8 October 1869
- June 1870 explosion of more seds at the Black Mills
- April 1872 explosion at the Black Mills with one fatality (John Corcoran)
- March 1877 explosion at the incorporating mill, claiming one life (Thade Connel)

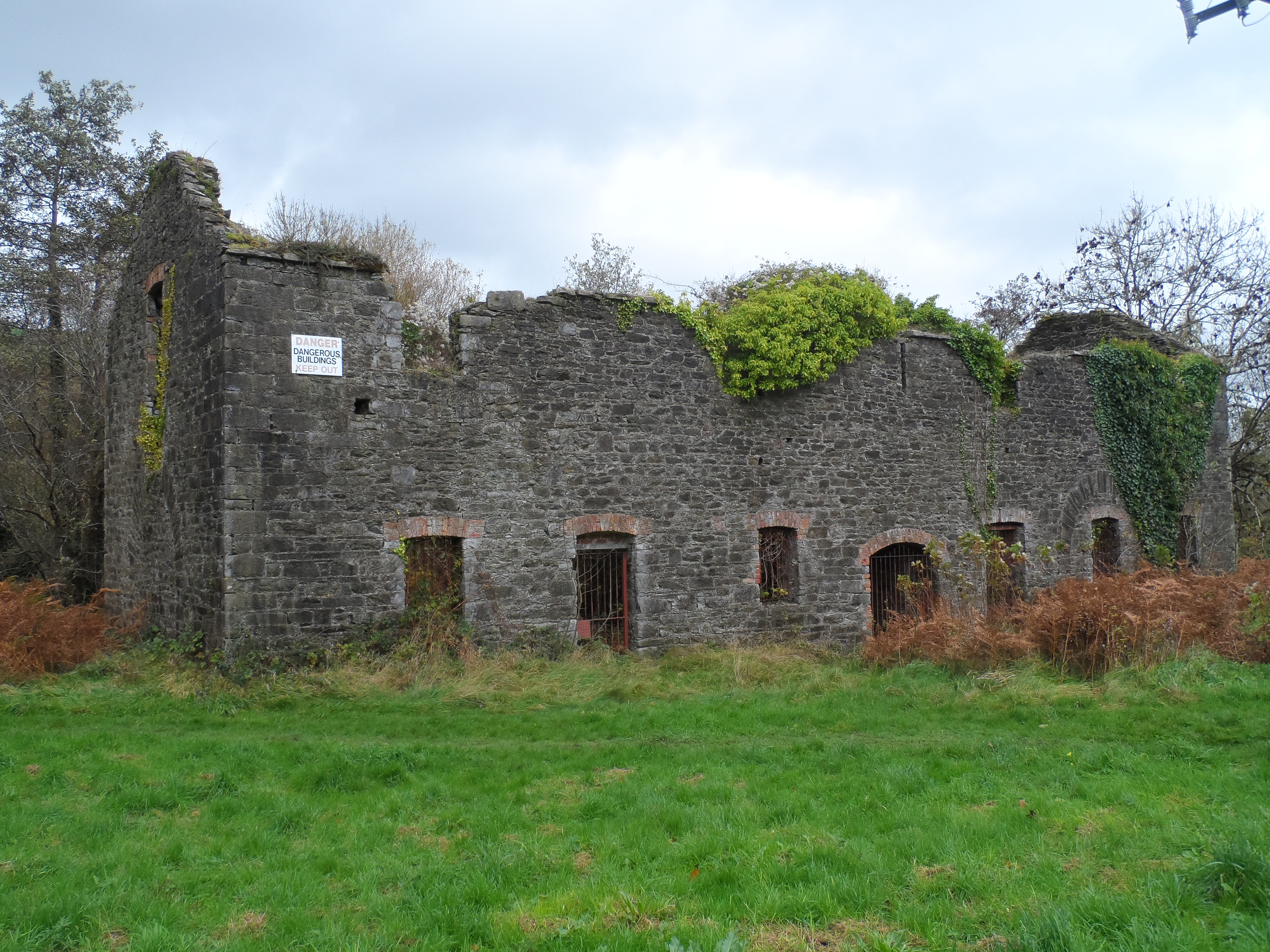
Building in the powder mill

=== Dangers in the city ===
In November 1810, Ballincollig gunpowder was associated with a major disaster in Cork city itself. At about 10 o'clock on the evening of 3 November a violent explosion rocked the Brandy Lane area of the city, with three houses demolished and a number of others set on fire. Crowds of people converged on the area. A scene of chaos awaited them; dismembered bodies, clothing, household furniture and ware, plus other debris, were strewn around. Parties were organised to comfort survivors, fight fires and carry out other tasks. Rescuers worked through the night, and by morning 19 bodies had been pulled from the ruins. The deaths of three survivors in hospital brought the number of fatalities to 22. The cause of the tragedy was ascribed to the pilfering of gunpowder from the Ballincollig Mill. A worker had found a market for the powder in quarries near the city and each evening he brought small quantities to his home in Brandy Lane. It surmised that carelessness while drying the powder with candles was the cause of the explosion.

== Heritage and community development (1974 – present) ==
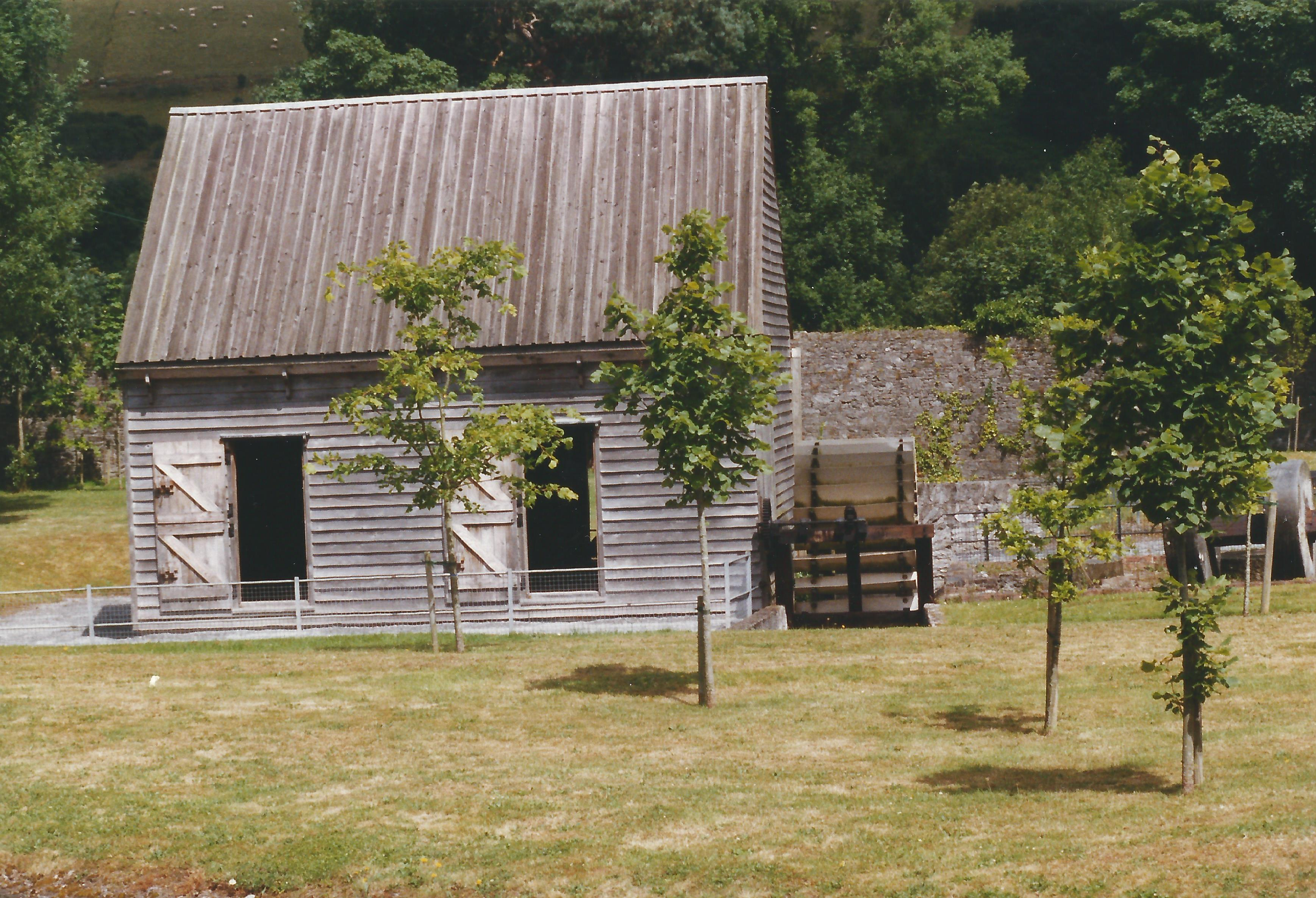
Reconstructed incorporating mill.

The mills closed in 1903 after the end of the Boer War and the site came to be owned by Imperial Chemical Industries (ICI). In 1974, Cork County Council bought the land from ICI.

The weir, constructed by Leslie when the mills first opened, collapsed in December 2014. The site surrounding the weir had become a popular swimming location, but following its collapse the current has flowed much more quickly, and several people have drowned or almost drowned in the waters close to the weir. It has been proposed that the Office of Public Works may intervene in the restoration of the weir.

Some of the site (at the Innishmore end) was used for community development. The rest of the site was developed into Ballincollig Regional Park. The canals were cleaned out and bridges built and greenery cleared off the surviving buildings. The grounds are one of Ireland's largest industrial archaeology sites. Between 1984 and 1992, IR£500,000 was spent on the development of the area. With the aid of a European Community grant, the County Council opened a Heritage Centre in the incorporating mills area in 1993 and a working mill was reconstructed. However, in 2002, the centre closed on financial grounds. In 2022, the restored incorporating mill (pictured) was burnt down by vandals.

== See also ==
- Eleutherian Mills
- Faversham explosives industry
- Waltham Abbey Royal Gunpowder Mills
