= Cork and Macroom Direct Railway =

Railway in Ireland

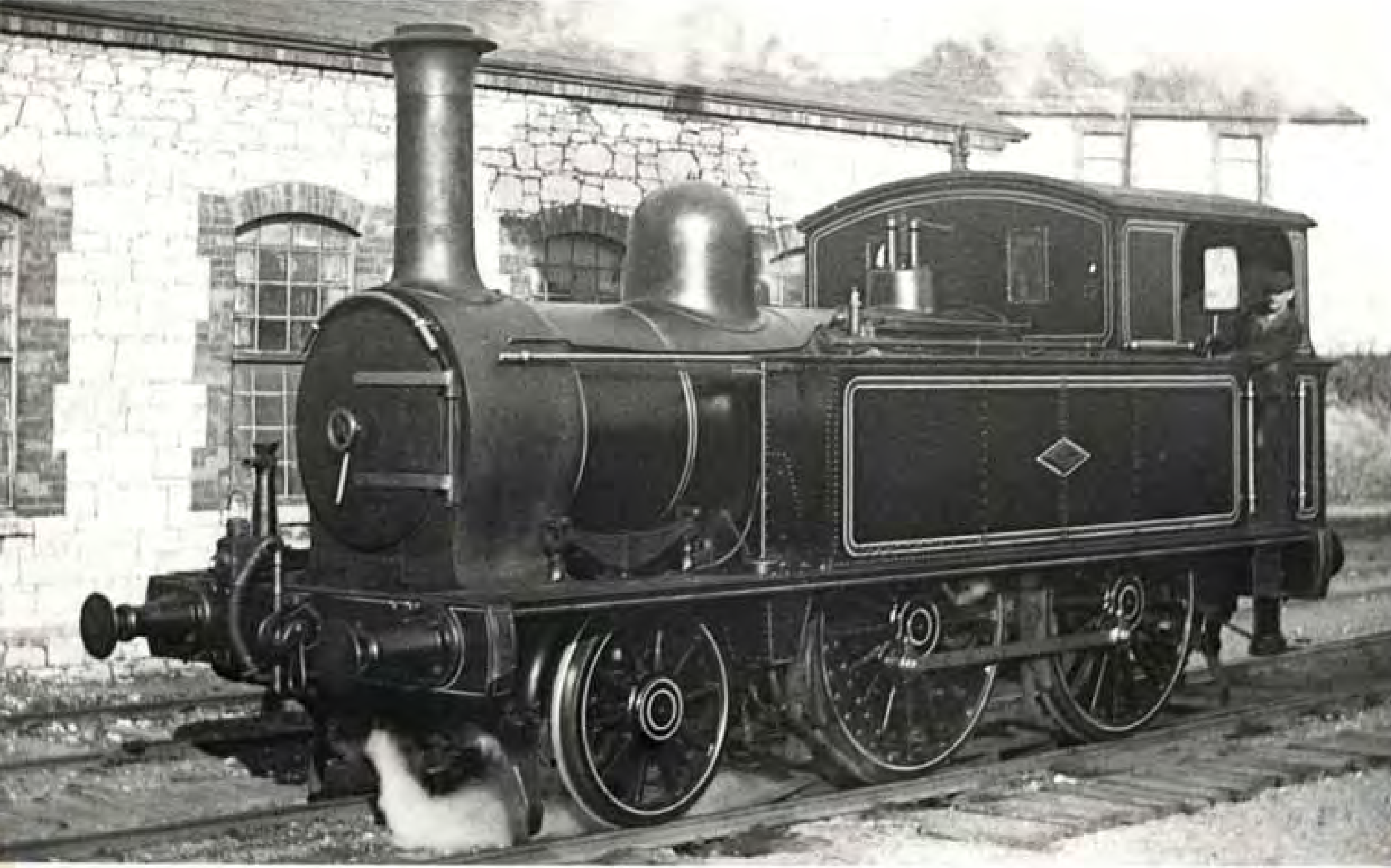
- CMDR 2-4-0T beside Capwell Cork engine shed

Overview
- Dates of operation: 1866–1953
- Successor: Great Southern Railways (GSR)

Technical
- Track gauge: 5 ft 3 in (1,600 mm)
- Length: 24 miles 13 chains (38.9 km)

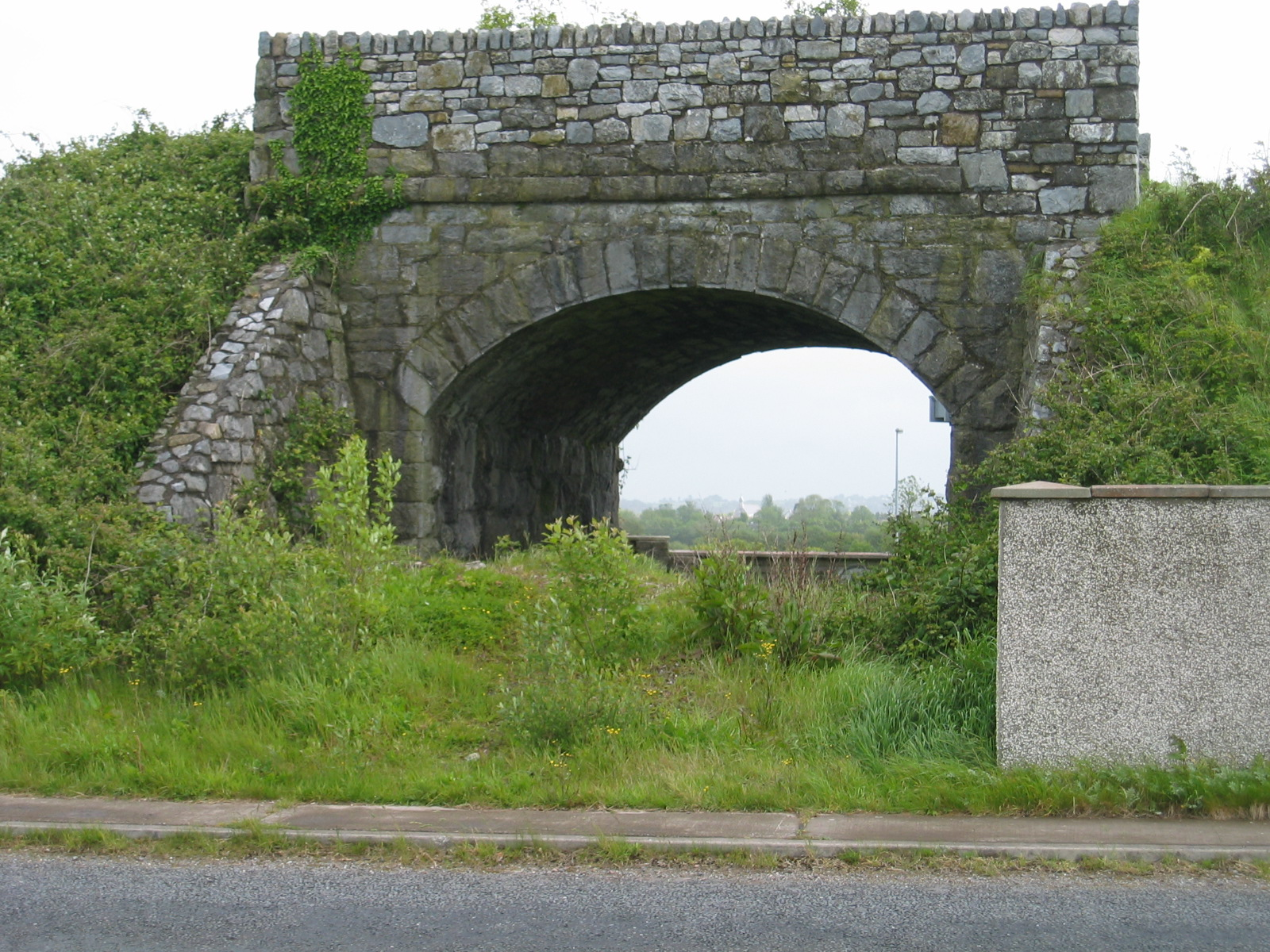
Cork—Macroom railway bridge

The Cork and Macroom Direct Railway (CMDR) was an Irish gauge (5 ft 3 in (1,600 mm)) railway in Ireland which ran the 24 miles (39 km) from Cork to Macroom.

== History ==
It was incorporated by the Cork and Macroom Direct Railway Act 1861 (24 & 25 Vict. c. ccvii) and was chaired by Sir John Arnott and Joseph Ronayne. The engineer for the scheme was Sir John Benson.

Construction work started in 1863. The line cost £6,000 per mile (equivalent to £702,000 in 2023) and there were five stations on the 24 miles 13 chains (24.16 miles, 38.89 km) length. It opened on 12 May 1866 and utilised the Cork, Bandon and South Coast Railway terminus at Albert Quay.

The company wanted independence from the Cork, Bandon and South Coast Railway (CBSCR) which was charging £2,000 per annum for the privilege, so it built a new terminus on Summerhill South road fed by a link from Ballyphehane Junction. Cork Capwell railway station cost £28,000 (equivalent to £3,596,035 in 2023), and opened in September 1879. The link with the CBSCR was severed as the CMDR wished to remain independent however they were forced to re-open it by the Irish Railways Executive Committee in 1918.

In 1925, the Cork and Macroom Direct Railway was amalgamated into the Great Southern Railways (GSR) along with other Irish railway companies. The CMDR whilst small was modestly profitable and had attempted to remain independent even again severing their link to the rest of the network but in the end their attempts were fruitless.

Powers to extend the CMDR to Kenmare had been granted but were never exercised.

== Closure ==
The Cork Capwell terminus closed on 2 March 1925, and trains reverted to the original terminus at Albert Quay. In 1929, the Capwell station buildings were acquired by the Irish Omnibus Company. The last regular passenger train was operated in 1935 and the line eventually closed to all remaining traffic in 1953 when part of its route was flooded for the creation of the Lee reservoir.

== Rolling Stock ==
=== Locomotives ===
The CMDR had five locomotives at the time absorption into the GSR.

CMDR No.	GSR No.	GSR Type	Type	Builder	Works No.	Introduced	Withdrawn	Notes
1		487/G5	2-4-0T	Dübs and Company	17	1865		Not passed to GSR in 1925
2	487	487/G5	2-4-0T	Dübs and Company	18	1865	1928	
3	488	487/G5	2-4-0T	Dübs and Company	235	1867	1934	
4	488	487/G5	2-4-0T	Dübs and Company	1505	1881	1928	
5	490	490/I2	0-6-2T	Andrew Barclay Sons & Co.	1022	1905	1935	
6	491	491/F5	2-4-2T	Vulcan Foundry	1315	1914	1934	Built 1891 for Waterford, Limerick and Western Railway

=== Carriages and wagons ===
At the time of the 1925 amalgamation the CMDR passed on 27 coaches and 117 wagons to the GSR.

=== Livery ===
In 1903 locomotives were light green with black and yellow lining. By the 1925 amalgamation they were black with red lining.

== Incidents ==
On 8 September 1878, there was a derailment east of Ballincollig that resulted in 5 deaths and 70 injuries. This incident resulted in significant financial outlay for the company for several years.

== Legislation ==
- Cork and Macroom Direct Railway Act 1861
- Cork and Macroom (Direct) Railway Act 1868
- Cork and Macroom Direct Railway Act 1877
- Cork and Macroom Direct Railway Act 1889
