= River Shournagh =

River in County Cork, Ireland, tributary of the River Lee

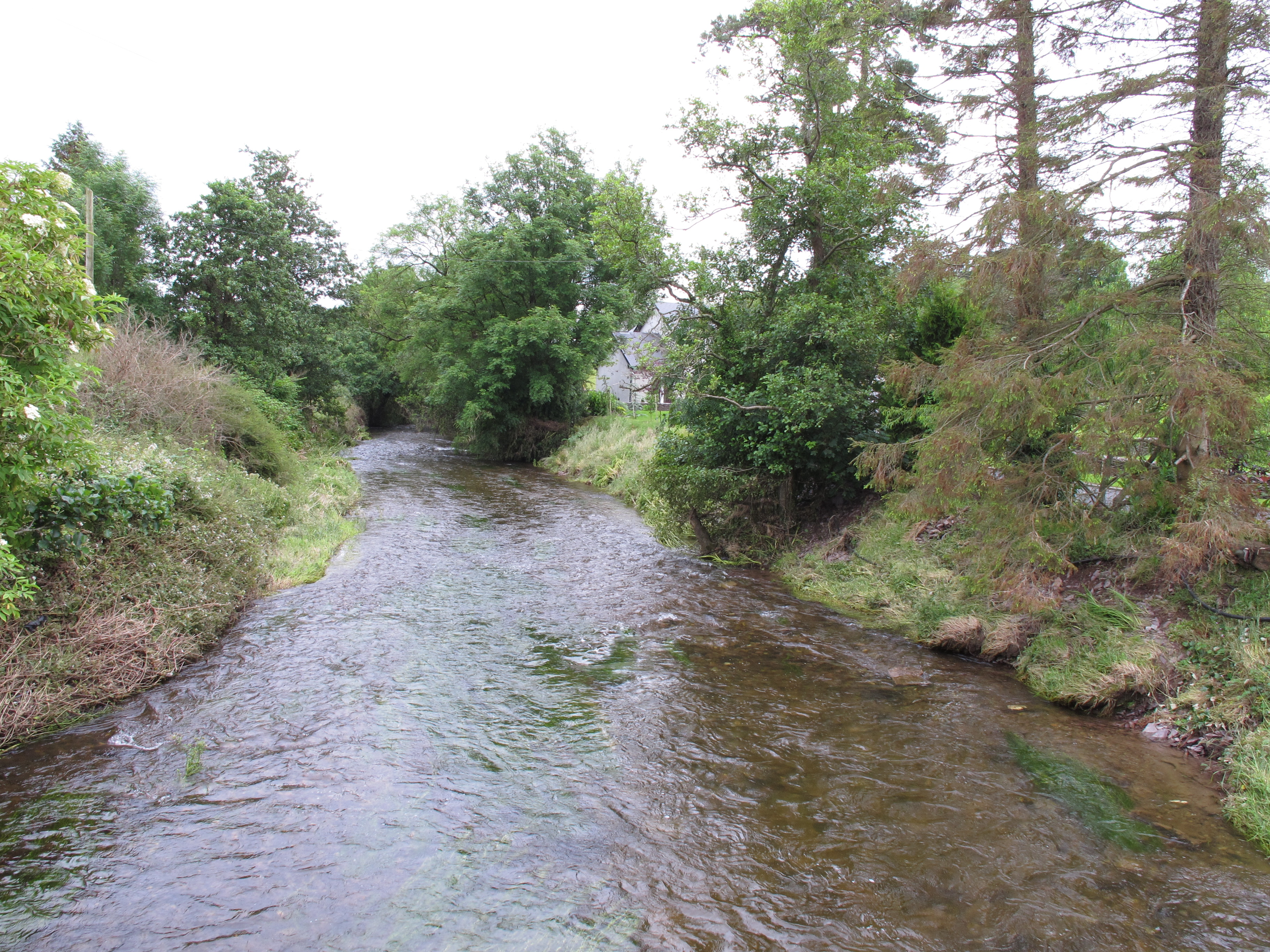
- Shournagh River at Fox's Bridge
- Native name: An tSeabharthanach (Irish)

Physical characteristics
- Source
  - location: Boggeragh Mountains near Bweeng
  - coordinates: 52°1′17″N 8°47′33″W
- Mouth
  - location: River Lee at Carrigrohane
- Length: 27 km (17 mi)

The River Shournagh (Irish: An tSeabharthanach), a left tributary of the River Lee, rises some 25 km (16 mi) northwest of the city of Cork in Ireland.

== Course ==
The Shournagh runs from the eastern foothills of the Boggeragh Mountains in the west of County Cork southwest of the village of Bweeng. From there, it flows in a southeast direction. It passes through the village of Donoughmore and close to the village of Matehy. Its lower valley is attractively wooded and can easily be viewed by walkers on the adjoining Shournagh Road. The Shournagh is joined by the River Martin west of the village of Blarney. It then flows southwest through the grounds of Muskerry Golf Club and then southeast to the village of Carrigrohane where it joins the River Lee. It passes through the following townlands — Meenahony, Commeenaplaw, Gowlane South, Knockyrourke, Lackabane, Garraunredmond, Coolmona, Curragh, Fornaght, Firmount, Ballyvodane, Bunkilla, Knockane, Kilclogh, Ballycraheen, Gilcagh, Courtbrack, Loughane West, Gortdonaghmore, Cloghphilip, Loughane East, Killowen, Kilnamucky, Boolypatrick, Bawnnafinny, Dromasmole, Coolflugh, Coolatanavally, Woodside, Carrigrohanebeg and Coolymurraghue.

== Transport ==
Much of the river valley forms the route of a road connecting the R617 road, which connects the villages of Tower and Blarney, with the village of Donoughmore. It was also the route of a railway line of 13.7 km (8.5 mi) from Saint Anne's on the Blarney line to Donoughmore. Opened in 1893, the line was an extension of the Cork and Muskerry Light Railway. There were stations at Burnt Mill, Fox's Bridge, Knockane and Firmount. An article in 1898 for rail travellers said, "The scenery along the lovely valley of the River Shournagh to Healy's Bridge is most charming." The railway was closed down in 1934.

== Recreation ==
The Duhallow Way walking route, part of the Blackwater Way passes close to the source of the river. It was mentioned in several fishing guides of the 19th and 20th centuries, including Dunne's hand-guide of 1892 and Matson's pocketbook of 1910. In relation to angling, a proposed 2020 bye-law concerning trout fishing in the lower valley of the River Lee mentioned that it would apply to fishing for sea trout and brown trout on the Lower Lee and its tributaries, including the Shournagh and the Martin. The last four holes at Muskerry Golf Club are beside the river. They are together termed the Shournagh Challenge and it's considered "the strongest four-hole finish in Ireland".

== Flooding ==
The river frequently burst it banks in its lower valley. It was being closely monitored at the end of February 2021 after it flooded part of the course of Muskerry Golf Club. The club captain explained that "a regular occurrence is where the river will flood onto the 18th green" but that the flooding on this occasion reached beyond the fairways, where it typically stops.

== Nature ==
The river has a population of three important riparian bird species — dipper, grey heron and grey wagtail. In June 1914, Cork Naturalists' Field Club had an excursion to the Shournagh Valley. They went to the townland of Gortdonaghmore and investigated the flora of the valley, which was regarded as being of " considerable interest". Among the plants found were Osmunda regalis (royal fern), Pinguicula grandiflora (large-flowered butterwort) and Drosera rotundifolia (round-leaved sundew). They walked down the valley and through the woods at St Anne's Hill to the railway station at St Anne's.

== Pollution ==
The river is liable to pollution from nearby agricultural activities. In June 1996, slurry on a farm near Blarney leaked into the River Martin and from it into the Shournagh. More than 3,000 fish (trout and salmon) died of oxygen deprivation due to the incident. In 2002, water quality in the river was considered satisfactory with slight pollution below the confluence with the River Martin.

== Reputation ==
The Official Handbook of the Cork Incorporated Chamber of Commerce, published in 1919, considered the Shournagh Valley to be "famous", referring to it as "beautiful" and "deserving of special mention". A 2019 planning document reported that the woods of the Shournagh Valley are "recommended for conservation and are noted to be of regional importance". The Shournagh Valley is a proposed National Heritage Area and as such is considered "of significance for wildlife" and "subject to limited protection".
