= Burnt Mill =

Burnt Mill (or Burnt Mills) may be:

- Harlow
- Burnt Mill Lock
- Burnt Mill Bridge
- Burnt Mill Academy
- Burnt Mill railway station (Ireland)

== See also ==
- Burnt Mills, Maryland
