= Gurteen =

Gurteen (also spelled Gorteen, Gortin), an Irish placename, may refer to:

== Villages ==
- Gurteen, County Galway, village in east County Galway
- Gorteen, village in County Sligo, often spelled Gurteen
- Gortin, village in County Tyrone

== Townlands ==
- Gorteen (Gorteenagarry), a townland in County Cavan
- Gorteen (Kinawley), a townland in Tullyhaw, County Cavan
- Gorteen, Templeport, a townland in County Cavan
- Gurteen, County Tipperary, a townland in County Tipperary

== Other ==
- Gurteen Beach, a beach in County Galway
- Gurteen College, an agricultural college in County Tipperary
- Gurteen railway station in County Cork
