= Coachford Junction railway station =

Station in County Cork, Ireland

Coachford Junction

General information
- Location: County Cork; Ireland
- Coordinates: 51.9168°N 8.6075°W

History
- Original company: Cork and Muskerry Light Railway
- Pre-grouping: Cork and Muskerry Light Railway
- Post-grouping: Great Southern Railways

Key dates
- 19 March 1888: Station opens
- 31 December 1934: Station closes
Location

Coachford Junction railway station was on the Cork and Muskerry Light Railway (CMLR) in County Cork, Ireland. The station marked the junction in the CMLR lines eastwards to the Blarney terminus station, and westwards to the Coachford terminus station.

== History ==
The station opened on 19 March 1888.

Passenger services were withdrawn on 31 December 1934.

== Routes ==
Preceding station	Disused railways	Following station
Healy's Bridge	Cork and Muskerry Light Railway; Cork-Coachford	Cloghroe
Terminus	Cork and Muskerry Light Railway; Coachford Junction-Blarney	Tower Bridge
