= Model Village, County Cork =

Model Village may refer to either of two places in County Cork, Ireland:

- Tower, County Cork (called "Model Village" on Ordnance Survey maps)
- Model Village, Dripsey
