= Dripsey railway station =

Railway station in Ireland

Dripsey

General information
- Location: County Cork; Ireland
- Coordinates: 51.918°N 8.718°W

History
- Original company: Cork and Muskerry Light Railway
- Pre-grouping: Cork and Muskerry Light Railway
- Post-grouping: Great Southern Railways

Key dates
- 19 March 1888: Station opens
- 31 December 1934: Station closes
Location

Dripsey railway station was on the Cork and Muskerry Light Railway in County Cork, Ireland.

== History ==
The station opened on 19 March 1888.

Passenger services were withdrawn on 31 December 1934.

== Routes ==
Preceding station	Disused railways	Following station
Gurteen	Cork and Muskerry Light Railway; Cork-Coachford	Kilmurry
