= Tower Bridge (disambiguation) =

Tower Bridge is a bridge in London, England.

Tower Bridge may also refer to:

- Tower Bridge (Sacramento, California), a bridge in Sacramento.
- Tower Bridge railway station, railway station in Ireland.
