= Tower Bridge railway station =

Railway station in Ireland

Tower Bridge

General information
- Location: Tower, County Cork; Ireland
- Coordinates: 51.9228°N 8.6031°W

History
- Original company: Cork and Muskerry Light Railway
- Pre-grouping: Cork and Muskerry Light Railway
- Post-grouping: Great Southern Railways

Key dates
- 8 August 1887: Station opens
- 31 December 1934: Station closes
Location

Tower Bridge railway station was on the Cork and Muskerry Light Railway in County Cork, Ireland. It served the village of Tower until its closure in 1934.

== History ==
The station opened on 8 August 1887. With the closure of the Cork and Muskerry Light Railway, passenger services were withdrawn on 31 December 1934. The nearby Tower Bridge, which was altered to accommodate the railway line, is a protected structure.

== Routes ==
Preceding station	Disused railways	Following station
Coachford Junction	Cork and Muskerry Light Railway; Coachford Junction-Blarney	St. Anne's
