= St. Anne's station =

St. Anne's station could refer to:

- St. Anne's station (PAAC), a light rail station in Pittsburgh, Pennsylvania
- St. Anne's railway station, a disused railway station in County Cork, Ireland
