= Healy's Bridge railway station =

Railway station in Ireland

Healy's Bridge

General information
- Location: County Cork; Ireland
- Coordinates: 51.9104°N 8.5788°W

History
- Original company: Cork and Muskerry Light Railway
- Pre-grouping: Cork and Muskerry Light Railway
- Post-grouping: Great Southern Railways

Key dates
- 8 August 1887: Station opens
- 31 December 1934: Station closes
Location
- Location within Ireland

Healy's Bridge railway station was on the Cork and Muskerry Light Railway in County Cork, Ireland.

== History ==
The station opened on 8 August 1887.

Passenger services were withdrawn on 31 December 1934.

== Routes ==
Preceding station	Disused railways	Following station
Leemount	Cork and Muskerry Light Railway; Cork-Coachford	Coachford Junction
