= Donoughmore railway station =

Railway station in Ireland

Donoughmore

General information
- Location: Donoughmore, County Cork; Ireland
- Coordinates: 51.9965°N 8.7338°W

History
- Original company: Donoughmore Extension Light Railway
- Pre-grouping: Cork and Muskerry Light Railway
- Post-grouping: Great Southern Railways

Key dates
- 6 May 1893: Station opens
- 31 December 1934: Station closes
Location

Donoughmore railway station was on the Cork and Muskerry Light Railway in County Cork, Ireland.

== History ==
The station opened on 6 May 1893.

Passenger services were withdrawn on 31 December 1934.

== Routes ==
Preceding station	Disused railways	Following station
Firmount	Cork and Muskerry Light Railway; Cork-Coachford	Terminus
