= 2019 Cork boundary change =

Internal border change in Ireland

The municipal boundary of Cork city before (bright orange) and after (pale peach) the 2019 expansion

The boundary between Cork city and County Cork, under the local jurisdiction of Cork City Council and Cork County Council respectively, was changed in mid 2019 when the Local Government Act 2019 came into force after the 2019 local elections, with the city area quadrupling in size. Its implementation followed the Cork Local Government Review, a 2015 review by the Cork Local Government Committee which recommended merging the two councils into a single "super-council". The recommendation was unpopular within the city and in 2017, after a review, it was dropped in favour of extending the city boundary into territory of the county. This alternative was not approved by the county council, which meant the Fine Gael-led government was obliged to pass an Act of the Oireachtas to effect it.

Areas transferred from the county to the city are (clockwise from the south east): Rochestown, Douglas, Grange, Donnybrook, Frankfield, Cork Airport, Togher, Ballincollig, Kerry Pike, Tower, Blarney, Killeens, Ballyvolane, White's Cross, and Glanmire.

Adjacent areas remaining in the county are (clockwise from the south east): Passage West, Carrigaline, Ballygarvan, Waterfall, Ballinora, Killumney, Ovens, Inniscarra, Cloghroe, Matehy, Monard, Knockraha, Glounthaune, and Little Island.

== Background ==
Prior to the 2019 extension, the most recent previous extension of the boundary of the city council area was in 1965. At the 2011 census, there were 119,230 people in the city proper and 79,352 in adjacent suburbs within the county. Under the Local Government Act 1991, (Note: Part 8 of the Local Government Act 2001, which would have replaced the 1991 procedure, was repealed by the Local Government Reform Act 2014 without ever having come into force.) the Minister for the Environment, Community and Local Government can by statutory instrument change the boundaries of local government areas including cities and counties, subject to a formal proposal from the relevant local authority and a report from a local boundary committee appointed to review the boundaries.

== Committee ==
The committee's terms of reference were specified by minister Alan Kelly. It could recommend either merging the two councils into a single local government area for County Cork, or else adjusting the boundary between Cork city and the county. The five committee members were:

- Alf Smiddy, formerly managing director of Beamish and Crawford brewery in Cork, who chaired the committee
- Tom Curran, former county manager with Kerry County Council
- John Lucey, a Senior Counsel
- Dermot Keogh, history professor at University College Cork (UCC)
- Theresa Reidy, politics lecturer at UCC

== Report ==
After a public consultation, its report was submitted in September 2015. The majority report, by Smiddy, Curran, and Lucey, recommends a single council, with more powers than existing county councils have under the 2001 act and the Local Government Reform Act 2014. The super-council would have three subunits called "divisions", one being a "metropolitan division" around Cork city, the others respectively covering the north and east of the county and the south and west of it. The divisions would be further divided into municipal districts as defined under the 2014 act.

Keogh and Reidy submitted a minority report arguing for retention of separate city and county councils, with a boundary adjustment increasing the area of the city council. The minority report interpreted the "metropolitan division" proposed in the majority report as nothing more than a municipal district with no budgetary powers.

=== City/metropolitan boundary ===
The majority report recommended that the "metropolitan division" around the city should correspond to the existing Metropolitan Cork statistical area, with a population of 289,739, as far out as Ballinhassig, Minane Bridge, Cloyne, Midleton, Watergrasshill, and Dripsey. It did not specify a boundary for the "metropolitan district" within the metropolitan division, but said all municipal district boundaries should be redrawn by an implementation committee.

The minority report recommended that the city boundary be extended to the satellite towns of Ballincollig, Blarney, Carrigtwohill, and Carrigaline, but not Midleton or Cobh. It would have a population between 230,000 and 235,000, the precise boundary to be negotiated between the city and county councils.

Cork city and hinterland areas considered by the Review
Description	Area (km^{2})	2011 census
City council local government area	40	119,230
Central Statistics Office census "city and suburbs" area	165	198,582
"Cork Metropolitan Area" in city council's submission to the Review		c.235,000
"Metropolitan Cork" for strategic regional planning	834	289,739
"Study area" for the Cork Area Strategic Plan	4,102	408,157
Combined city and county council local government areas	7,505	519,032

== Response ==
In general, politicians from the county agreed with the majority report, while politicians and civic groups from the city favoured retaining a separate city council. Cork South-Central TD Ciarán Lynch commissioned a poll of the constituency showing 59 percent support for boundary extension and 23 percent for amalgamation, which county mayor John Paul O’Shea criticised as a "biased survey".

Eighteen former Lord Mayors of the city signed a letter opposing any merger with the county. A specially convened meeting of the city council on 22 September 2015 resolved by 29 votes to none to seek a judicial review in the High Court of the proposal's constitutionality, and to write to the Taoiseach and minister demanding a halt to the process. The county council endorsed the majority report on 28 September 2015, with only Sinn Féin councillors opposed.

Alan Kelly, the responsible minister, backed the majority report. Simon Coveney, a government minister from near Carrigaline, advised voters to read the full report before passing judgment. In the Dáil, Micheál Martin and Jonathan O'Brien opposed it while Kelly supported it. In the Seanad, Paul Bradford opposed while junior minister Jimmy Deenihan replied that there were "obviously pros and cons". Michael McCarthy, Labour TD for Cork South-West, and chair of the Dáil Committee on Environment, Culture and the Gaeltacht, invited the review committee members to address the Dáil committee.

Cork chamber of commerce, which straddles both council areas, favours amalgamation. The Cork branch of IBEC made a submission in favour of retaining separate councils but subsequently endorsed the majority report, denying this was a U-turn. Cork Institute of Technology president Brendan Murphy backed the merger; UCC did not initially take a position, while defending the right of the UCC faculty on the committee to express a minority view.

In a February 2016 debate before the general election, eight of nine Cork candidates were opposed to the merger, with Fine Gael's Dara Murphy saying "It has been too divisive. What we are left with now is the status quo, which is the worst of both worlds."

UCC commissioned Tony Bovaird of the University of Birmingham to review both majority and minority reports. Bovaird said the minority report was "much better substantiated", while Alf Smiddy dismissed Bovaird's review as "a continuation of an ongoing orchestrated saga from certain narrow quarters to frustrate the Government".

== Expert advisory group ==
Early in 2016, the Cork report was considered by the government's Committee on Social Policy and Public Service Reform, along with another recommending merging Galway City and County. After the 2016 election, Simon Coveney became Minister for Housing, Planning, Community and Local Government in the Fine Gael–led government. In June, he announced that a new expert group would take "a fresh look" at the Cork question. In September, he appointed an "expert advisory group" with detailed terms of reference including "having regard particularly to the review carried out by the Cork Local Government Review Committee and its report". Unlike the original committee, the review group's terms referred to the city's "strategic role" as a "regional and national growth centre".

The group's members were:

- Jim Mackinnon, chief planner of the Scottish Government
- Paul Martin, chief executive of the councils of the London boroughs of Richmond and Wandsworth, which merged their staff in October 2016
- John O’Connor, chairman of An Bórd Pleanála and EirGrid
- Gillian Keating, former President of Cork Chamber of Commerce

The group was originally expected to report in early 2017. Its 130-page draft report was submitted in April, and in May 2017, Coveney returned it for revision of specified points.

In June 2017, Coveney published the group's report (called the "Mackinnon Report" by media) and said he intended to implement it in time for the 2019 local elections. The report provided for the city boundary to be extended to include Little Island, Cork Airport, Ballincollig, Blarney, and Carrigtwohill, adding a population of over 100,000. Under the plan, places further from the city would remain part of the county, including Cobh, Carrigaline, and Midleton, as well as Ringaskiddy, the centre of the Port of Cork. The report gives parameters for compensation to be paid by the city to the county for the consequent reduction in its revenue. The revised proposal was welcomed by Micheál Martin but criticised by some county councillors. The city council voted unanimously to accept it. Barry Roche of The Irish Times wrote that the Mackinnon Report "has proven almost as divisive as its predecessor", except with the city and county councils' positions reversed.

== Implementation Oversight Group ==
On 28 July 2017, Coveney appointed a three-person "Cork Local Government Implementation Oversight Group" (IOG). Its terms of reference included planning and overseeing the implementation of the expert advisory group's report, but also adjusting the boundary delineation. The IOG facilitated discussions between the chief executives of the two councils, who reached an agreement in December on a compromise whereby the city would be extended to include Ballincollig, Blarney, Glanmire, and Cork Airport, but not Little Island or Carrigtwohill. The cabinet accepted the IOG report on 13 December. A county council meeting on 15 December 2017 voted 28–5 to reject the proposal, with Sinn Féin the only party to support it. A city council meeting on 18 December endorsed the IOG proposal.

On 13 December 2017 two LEA Boundary Committees were established and tasked with drawing all LEA boundaries for the 2019 local election, except initially excluding Cork city and county. The IOG finalised its boundary by 27 February 2018. On 23 March 2018 Cork city and Cork county were added to the remit of the LEA Boundary Committees, using the IOG city–county boundary and keeping the current numbers of councillors. Although county and city boundaries can be adjusted by statutory instrument under the Local Government Act 1991, this requires the consent of both adjoining local authorities; absent the consent of Cork County Council, the IOG boundary change can only be implemented by primary legislation. This led to the Local Government Bill 2018, for which Phelan moved the second reading in the Dáil on 18 October 2018. The bill was initially passed by the Dáil on 13 December and the Seanad on 19 December; the Dáil agreed to the Seanad's amendments on 23 January, and the bill was sign it into law on 25 January by the President, Michael D. Higgins.

== Implementation ==
The boundary change took place on 31 May 2019, at which time the land area of the city area increased from 39 km^{2} to 187 km^{2}, and the population within the city bounds increased from 125,000 to 210,000.

The change followed the 2019 Cork City Council election, which had taken place on 24 May, and among the 31 incoming city councillors were four outgoing county councillors, based in local electoral areas transferred to the city. At the first annual meeting of the new council on 7 June, John Sheehan was elected Lord Mayor. At the first business meeting on 10 June, Sheehan said the council would seek increased representation on the Southern Regional Assembly to reflect its increased population and area.
