= Victoria station =

Victoria station may refer to:

== Railway and tram stations ==
=== Operational ===
- London Victoria station and Victoria tube station, in England
- Llandudno Victoria tram stop, in Wales
- Manchester Victoria station, in England
- Southend Victoria railway station, in England
- Square-Victoria–OACI station, in Montreal, Canada
- Victoria metro station, Athens, in Greece
- Victoria metro station, Kolkata, in India
- Chhatrapati Shivaji Terminus, also known as Victoria Terminus, in Mumbai, India

=== Closed ===
- Norwich Victoria railway station, in England
- Nottingham Victoria railway station, in England
- Sheffield Victoria railway station, in England
- Swansea Victoria railway station, in Wales
- Victoria railway station (Ireland), in County Cork
- Victoria (Blaenau Gwent) railway station, in Wales
- Victoria Dock railway station, also known as Victoria station, in Hull, England
- Victoria station (British Columbia), in Victoria, Canada

== Bus and coach stations ==
- Victoria bus station, in London, England
- Victoria Coach Station, in London, England
- Nottingham Victoria bus station, in England

== Other ==
- Victoria Station (restaurant), a restaurant chain
- Victoria Station (play), by Harold Pinter

== See also ==
- Victoria Park station (disambiguation)
- Victoria Street station (disambiguation)
