= Kilmurry =

Kilmurry means "Church of Mary" in Irish, and is the name of several villages or parishes. It may refer to:

- Kilmurry GAA, a Gaelic football club based in the division of Muskerry of Cork GAA in the county of Cork
- Kilmurry Civil parish, in the barony of Muskerry West, County Cork, Ireland
- Kilmurry Ibrickane (civil parish), in the barony Ibrickane in County Clare
- Kilmurry Ibrickane GAA, a Gaelic Athletic Association club in County Clare
- Kilmurry McMahon, in the barony of Clonderlaw, Clare
- Kilmurry-Negaul, near Sixmilebridge, Clare
- Kilmurry railway station, on the Cork and Muskerry Light Railway in County Cork
