= Shrine of Saint Lachtin's Arm =

Irish reliquary made of wood and metal

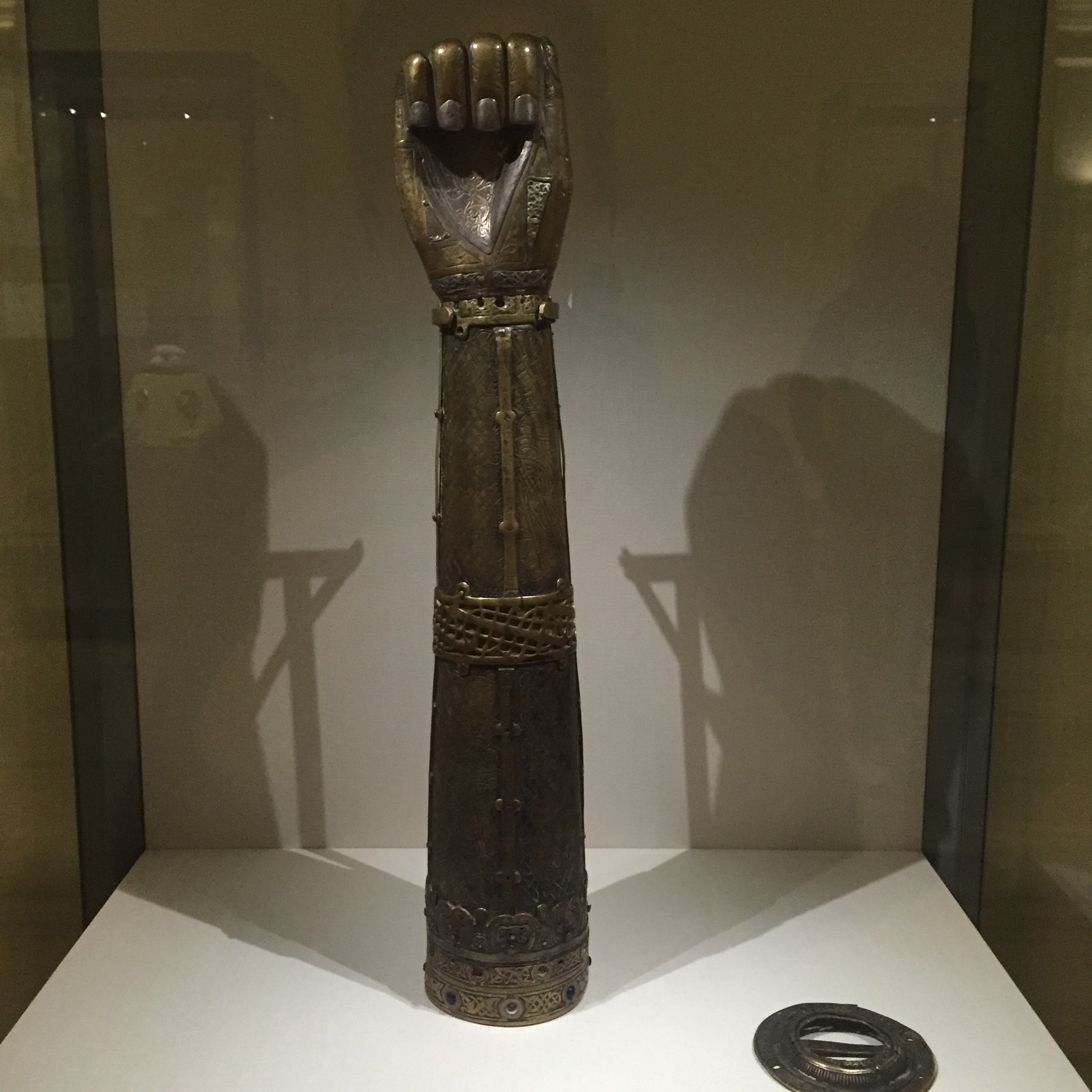
- Shrine of Saint Lachtin's Arm
- Material: Wooden core with bronze, silver, copper, gold, glass and niello
- Size: Height 39 cm, width 7 cm, depth 7 cm
- Created: Between 1118 and 1121
- Period/culture: Celtic, Insular
- Discovered: 1750; Donoughmore, County Cork, Ireland
- Present location: National Museum of Ireland, Dublin
- Identification: NMI, R2988

The Shrine of Saint Lachtin's Arm (known in Irish as Lámh Lachtaín) is an early 10th-century Irish arm-shrine type reliquary made of wood and metal shaped as an outstretched forearm and clenched fist. St. Lachtin's dates to between 1118 and 1121 and is associated with his church in the village of Stuake, Donoughmore, County Cork, but probably originates from Kilnamartyra, also in Cork. It consists of a yew-wood core lined with decorated bronze and silver plates. The wood at the hand is hollowed out to create a reliquary cavity which once held the arm bone of St. Lachtin (b. 526, County Cork) but is now empty. The circular cap at its base contains a large transparent gemstone and is inlayed with silver decorated with filigree.

The shrine is 39 cm high, 7 cm wide and 7 cm deep. Because the hand is clenched rather than, as is more usual for arm shrines, open as if in the act of blessing, it may have functioned as a battle standard or talisman to protect or heal combatants. Saint Lachtin's Arm was rediscovered by antiquarians c. 1750, having been in the care of its hereditary keepers, the Healy family, for around 200 years. It was acquired that year from Donoughmore Church by the art collector Andrew Fountaine. Thereafter, it passed through various private and public collections and has been in the collection of the archaeology branch of the National Museum of Ireland (NMI), Dublin, since 1890.

The shrine is described as "one of the finest examples of ecclesiastical metalwork from medieval Ireland". It is one of two surviving Irish arm-shrines (although many more would have been produced, including those of Ruadhán of Lorrha (d. 584) and Ciarán of Clonmacnoise (d. c. 549)), the other being the 14th-century Shrine of Saint Patrick's Hand, also empty and also at the NMI.

== Description ==
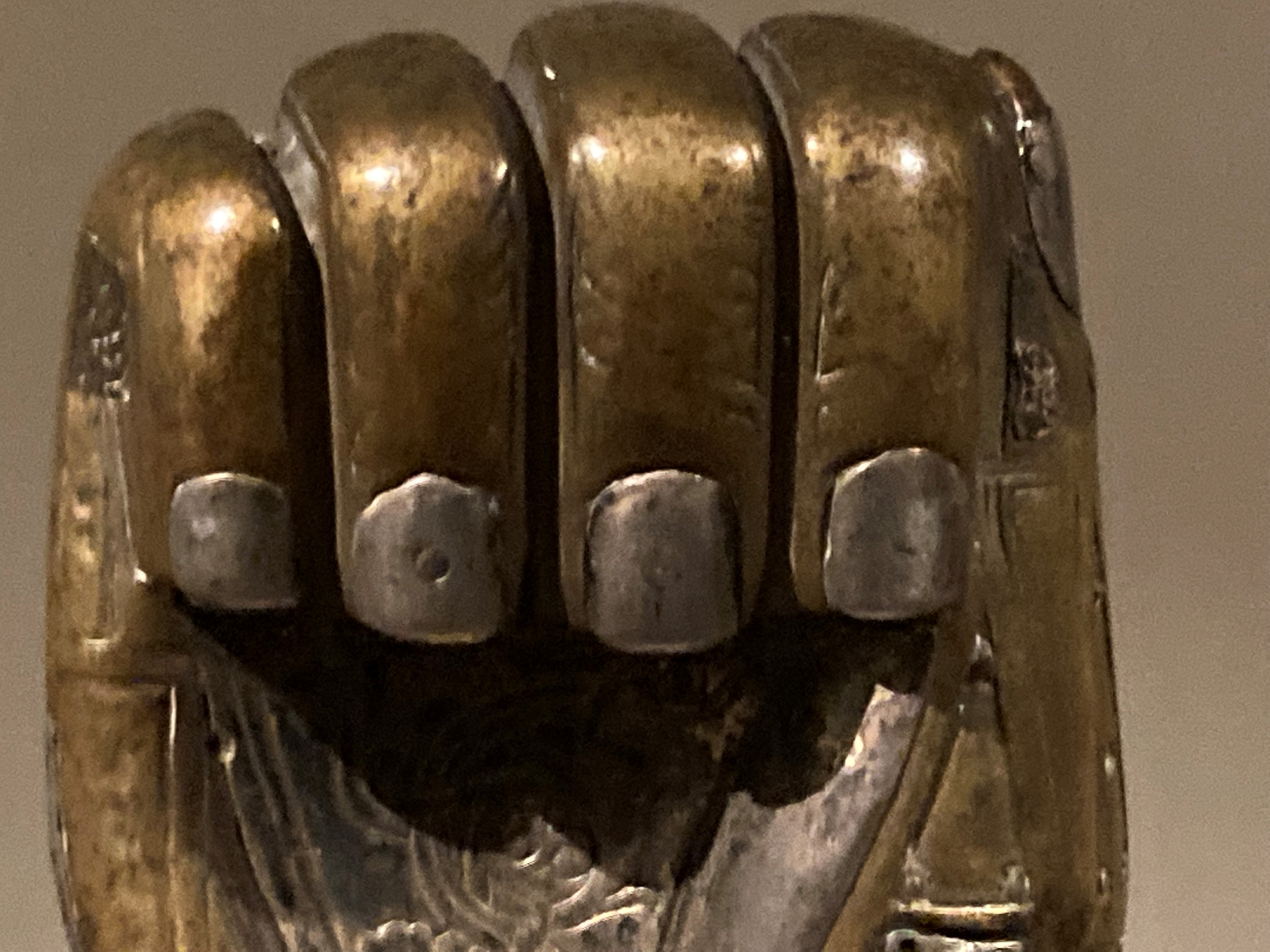
Detail of the clenched fist and row of fingers

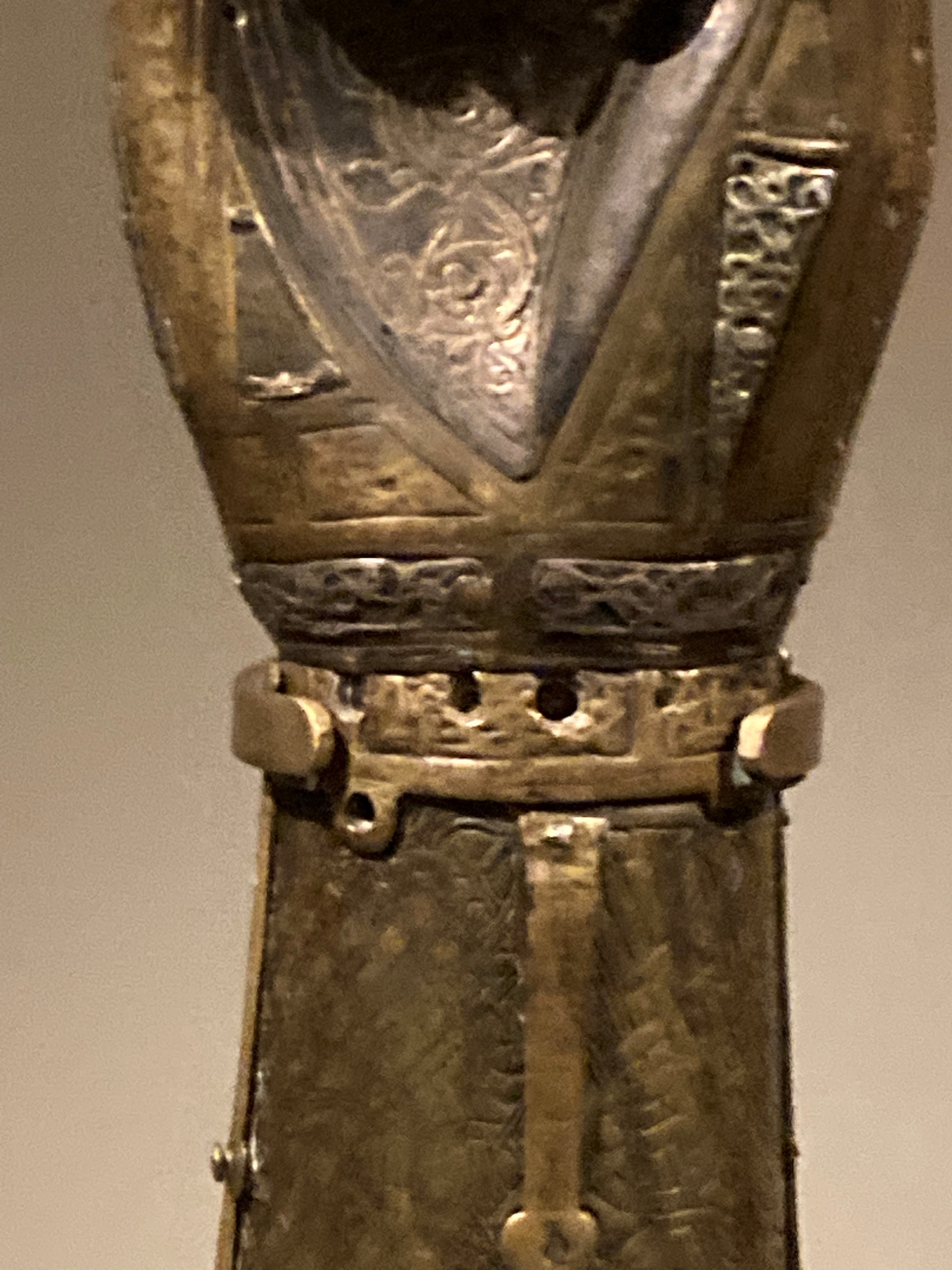
Hand and wrist

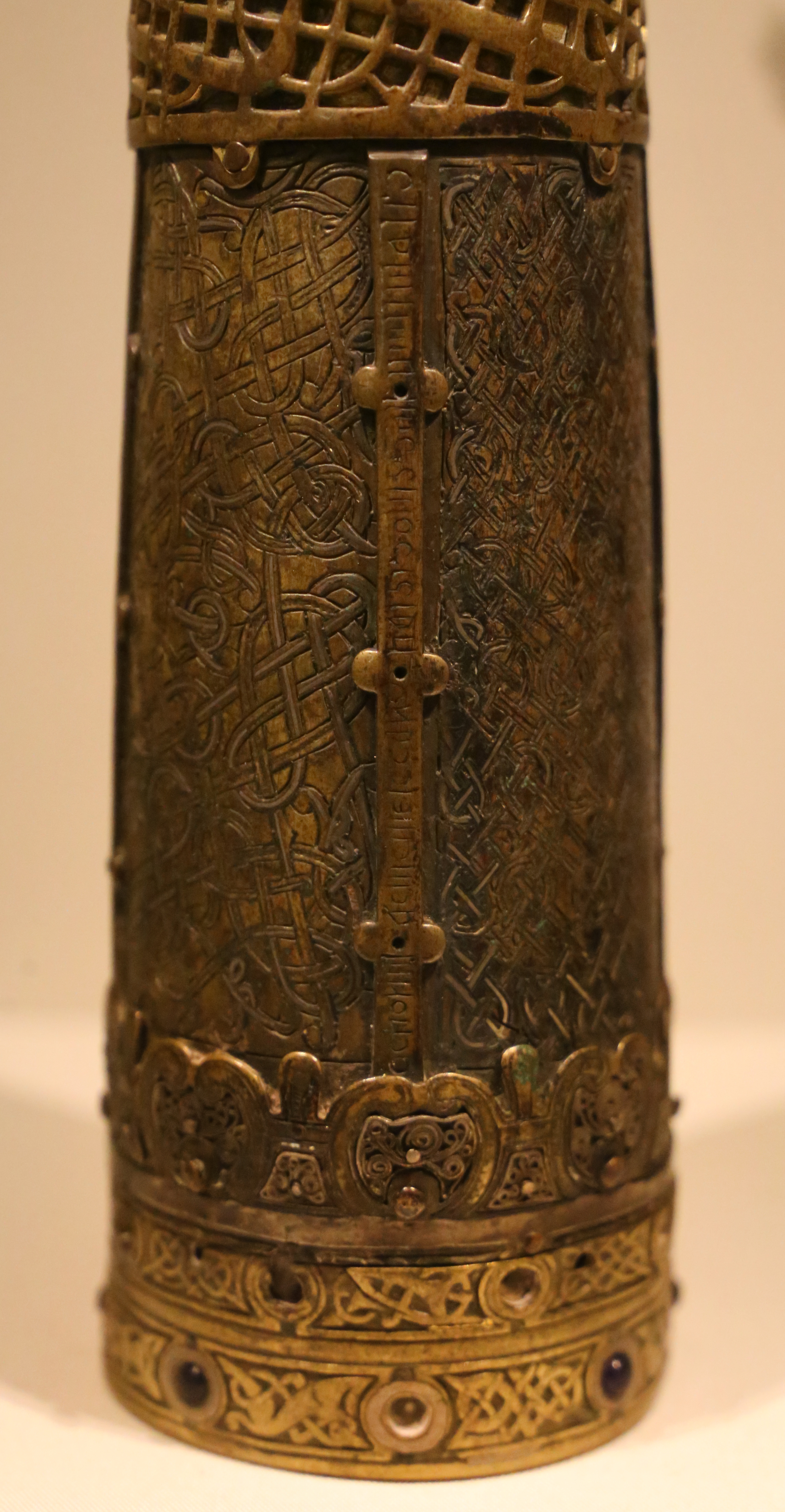
Lower arm

Although arm shrines of this type were becoming popular across Europe, Lachtin's is one of the earliest and is decorated in a distinctively Irish style. The fingers are inwardly bent, and the hand is tightly clasped in a half-fist, rather than, as usually found in Insular arm-shrines, open as if raised in benediction (blessing). The art historian Rachel Moss suggests that the defiant gesture may indicate that the shrine, similar to the Cathach of St. Columba, was used as a battle standard or talisman, that is brought to a battlefield to protect or heal combatants, or bring victory against their opponents.

The shrine is built from a yew-wood core lined with eight large plates bound by eight binding strips and a central openwork collar. The metal plates are made from bronze and silver and decorated with engraved ribboned zoomorphic and foliate designs which bear distinctive elements influenced by Viking art: the patterns have been described as crafted in the Hiberno-Ringerike and Hiberno-Urnes. Some of the interlace may have been added after the first phase c. 1120.

The hand and fingers are made from a variety of shaped plates and have cast-interlace and silver filigree. The inlay around the fingernails employs silver ribbons framed with niello (a black mixture for inlay), a technique described by Roger Stalley as creating an "attractive black and silver pattern set against a gilded bronze base...[that is]...exploited in an ambitious fashion on the shrine of Saint Lachtin's Arm". The plate below the fingers contains acanthus foliage.

The circular cap at the base is the most lavishly decorated part of the shrine. It contains panels of filigree and stamped silver ribbons. The central round boss is made from rock crystal and lined with filigree similar to that on the border panels. An 1884 drawing made at the Science and Art Department in London shows that the crystal once held "elaborately decorated metal" that is now lost. The boss was lined by a cruciform arrangement of purple, yellow and blue enamel dividing strips, some of which are also lost but were shown in the 1884 drawing.

== Inscriptions ==
The inscriptions are engraved in niello and contain prayers for the commissioner and metalworkers. That the names may once have included craftsmen is supported by the fact that the 11th and 12th centuries were a time of renewed interest in reliquaries, leading to high demand for the upper echelon of metalworkers. Their names are first recorded in similar etchings.

An inscription on one of the binding strips translates as "A prayer for Maolseachnail O Callaghan, Ard Ri of the Ua Ealach Mumhain who made this shrine". Other inscriptions, also on the strips, mention Tadhg Mac Carthaigh, a King of Desmond (which covered roughly today's County Cork and most of County Kerry) from 1118, and who was probably its commissioner, Diarmuid son of Mac Denisc, and Máel Sechnaill Ua Cellachain (d. 1121) and others whoes names place its origin in Cork. The identification of Tadhg Mac Carthaigh as commissioner is based on the shrine's similarity to other known works whose creation his family oversaw, including the sarcophagus, high cross and Cormac's Chapel at the Rock of Cashel, County Tipperary. Unlike other surviving or documented arm-shaped reliquaries not built to hold primary corporeal remains and instead used for ceremonial or symbolic purposes, Saint Lachtin's Arm is known to have once held Lachtin's bones.

The shrine's dating comes from badly damaged but legible inscriptions that specify completion between 1118 and 1121, and on estimates of Mac Carthaigh's succession to kingship. Writing in 1923, the art historian Henry Crawford placed it as "before 1127". The Metropolitan describes its copy as based on an "original dated 1106".

== Condition ==
It is in relatively good condition and does not appear to have been significantly altered or restored. Some of the silver and gold work is lost, and it was crudely opened before 1829, when it was cut apart at both ends. The art historian Griffin Murray says this was "presumably to see the contents" and notes that the process led to the loss of "a whole row of glass studs" and damage to some of the decorations on the plate.

Portions of the inlay are worn, as are the inscriptions, although they are still largely legible.

== Provenance ==
Very little of St. Lachtin is known except that he was born in Cork and founded the monasteries of Donoughmore and nearby Kilnamartyra in the 7th century. Writing in 1750, Charles Smith, in his book The ancient and present state of the county and city of Cork said that "the patron saint [of Donoughmore] was named St Lachteen, and some years ago the parish priest kept here a brazen hand as a holy relic, by which the people swore upon all solemn occasions, but the hand was removed by one of the titular Bishops of Cloyne."

The wealthy Healy family were its hereditary keepers before the 18th century, and it is known that it was valued enough that they used it as a deed to their estate and argued over its ownership during a (underlying land) dispute with the see of Cloyne. It was at Donoughmore Church, County Cork, until 1750, when it was acquired by the art collector Andrew Fountaine of Norfolk.

It was sold at Christie's in 1884 to the British state-owned Science and Art Department, London, for £ 452 3s 6d. The purchase was led by Mervyn Wingfield, 7th Viscount Powerscourt, who sought to bring it into an Irish national collection, and it thus passed to the Royal Irish Academy that year. It has, in turn, been at the Kildare Street branch of the National Museum of Ireland, Dublin, since 1890 (then known as the Dublin Museum of Science and Art). An early 20th-century replica is in the Metropolitan Museum of Art, New York.
