= Victoria Park station =

Victoria Park station may refer to:

== Australia ==
- Victoria Park railway station, Melbourne
- Victoria Park railway station, Perth
- Victoria Park transfer station, a bus station in Western Australia

== Canada ==
- Victoria Park station (Toronto), a subway station on the Line 2 Bloor-Danforth in Toronto, Ontario
- Victoria Park station (Kitchener), an LRT station on the Ion service in Kitchener, Ontario
- Victoria Park/Stampede station, an LRT station on the CTrain Red line in Calgary, Alberta

== Hong Kong ==
- Causeway Bay North station, also known as Victoria Park, a proposed railway station on the North Island Line

== United Kingdom ==
- Victoria Park railway station (Northern Ireland), a station served by the Belfast and County Down Railway
- Victoria Park railway station (England), in London, the capital city of the United Kingdom
- Whiteinch Victoria Park railway station, in Glasgow, Scotland

== See also ==
- Victoria station (disambiguation)
