= Victoria Street station =

Victoria Street station may refer to:

- Victoria Street railway station, New South Wales, a railway station in Maitland, New South Wales, Australia
- Victoria Street railway station, Perth, Western Australia
- Victoria Street station (Metro Transit), a light rail station in Saint Paul, Minnesota, US
- A station on the Lemvig Line in western Denmark

== See also ==
- Belfast Great Victoria Street railway station
- Queen Victoria Street tube station, a proposed station on the Central London Railway.
- Victoria station (disambiguation)
- Victoria Street (disambiguation)
- Victoria Street tram stop in Blackpool, England
