= Cork Western Road railway station =

Railway station in Ireland

Cork Western Road

General information
- Location: Cork, County Cork; Ireland
- Coordinates: 51.8961°N 8.4836°W

History
- Original company: Cork and Muskerry Light Railway
- Pre-grouping: Cork and Muskerry Light Railway
- Post-grouping: Great Southern Railways

Key dates
- 8 August 1887: Station opened
- 31 December 1934: Station closed
Location

Cork Western Road railway station was a terminus station on the Cork and Muskerry Light Railway in County Cork, Ireland. The station was located at Lancaster Quay (the Bishop's Marsh) on the Western Road, close to what is now the River Lee Hotel in Cork city.

== History ==
The station opened on 8 August 1887.

Passenger services were withdrawn on 31 December 1934.

== Routes ==
Preceding station	Disused railways	Following station
Terminus	Cork and Muskerry Light Railway; Cork-Coachford	Victoria
