= Metropolitan Cork =

Coordinates: 51°54′N 08°28′W

- Metropolitan area
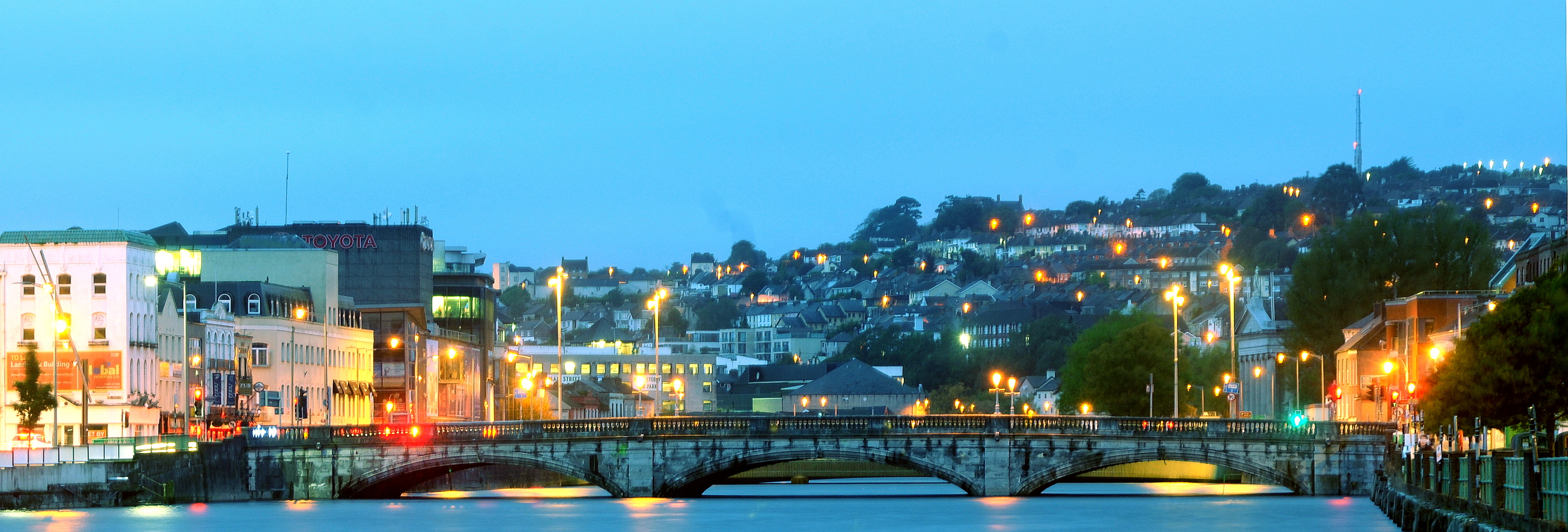
- Cork, the second largest city in the Republic of Ireland
- Interactive map of Metropolitan Cork
- Country: Ireland
- Region: County Cork
- Largest city: Cork (222,526)

Area
  - Metro: 820 km^{2} (320 sq mi)

Population (2016)
  - Metro: 305,000
  - Metro density: 370/km^{2} (960/sq mi)

GDP
  - Metro: €103.206 billion

Metropolitan Cork, or the Cork Metropolitan Area (CMA), includes the city of Cork, Ireland, its suburbs, the rural hinterland that surrounds it, which includes several smaller towns and villages. Some of the latter towns and villages are within the administrative area of County Cork.

The term Metropolitan Cork was used in the Cork Area Strategic Plan to refer to the area whose labour and property market is shared with the city. The plan declared that it was envisaged as an area with "an integrated transport system, and the social, cultural and educational facilities of a modern European city". Metropolitan Cork is the core employment hub of the Southern Region.

According to the Cork Area Transit System (CATS) Study Final Report of February 2010, at that time, the metropolitan area covered 820 km^{2} and approximately 270,000 people.

By mid-2018, legislation was drafted to expand the boundary of Cork city, to include a number of the metropolitan area towns (such as Blarney and Carrigtwohill). This change proposed to bring much of "Metropolitan Cork" within the bounds of the Cork City Council area. On 31 May 2019, the boundary change came into force with the city bounds being extended to include Ballincollig, Blarney, Glanmire, Rochestown, Grange and Cork Airport, and thereby increasing the city population from 125,000 to approximately 210,000.

== Geography ==
The Cork Area Strategic Plan (CASP) and subsequent regional planning documents, such as the Cork Metropolitan Area Transport Strategy, have used the term to describe a continuous urban core and a commuter belt stretching from Ovens to Midleton and Watergrasshill and Blarney to Carrigaline.

The metropolitan area includes Cork City and nearby commuter towns such as Ballincollig, Blarney, Carrigaline, Carrigtwohill, Cobh, Glanmire, Glounthaune, Midleton, Passage West, and Ringaskiddy. The boundary is not fixed and varies across contexts (e.g. transport, planning, and statistical definitions).

== Greater Cork ==
Greater Cork is an area that extends beyond Metropolitan Cork, and includes the Metropolitan Cork area itself (referred to in the regional planning guidelines as the "Cork Gateway"), plus Mallow and its hinterland, as well as the ring towns of Bandon, Fermoy, Kinsale, Macroom and Youghal. This Greater Cork area was recorded as having a population of 377,596 in 2006.

== Population ==
The Cork City administrative area (after the 2019 boundary extension) recorded a population of 224,004 in the 2022 census, while the overall population of County Cork was 584,156. The population of the wider Metropolitan Cork area was estimated to be around 305,000 as of 2016.

Year	Cork city	Cork city and suburbs	Metropolitan Cork	Greater Cork
2000	123,810	—	251,510	345,100
2001	123,600	—	253,000	—
2002	123,062	186,239	—	349,388
2006	119,418	190,384	274,000	377,596
2011	119,230	198,582	289,739	397,800 †
2016	125,622	208,669	305,222	—
2019	210,000 ‡		—	—
Note: † indicates medium-migration scenario projection from 2007 CASP plan Note: ‡ 2019 Cork boundary change brought many suburbs into Cork City Council bounds Note: — indicates no available data.
