= Blarney Woollen Mills =

Coordinates: 51.9332°N 8.5655°W

Blarney Woollen Mills was built in 1823. It was used mainly for spinning and weaving wool. The mill briefly closed for two years between 1973 and 1975, after which it was re-opened as an Irish heritage shop. It is located in the village of Blarney, County Cork, Ireland.

== Ownership ==
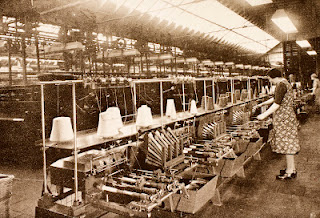
Spinning machine in use at the Mill

=== Mahony Brothers ===
Martin Mahony & Bros Ltd, owned by the brothers Martin and Noel, began building a mill in Blarney, County Cork in 1823. It was completed the following year. A decade later the mills employed 120 people, and by the middle of the 19th century its numbers had swelled to over 200.

Water was the power source for the mill and the Mahonys built a large dam on the Martin river (near Waterloo), forming a mill pond. The resulting pressure drove the mill-wheel at Blarney, via the millstream and millrace.

While textiles was a booming industry for Ireland in the 19th century, Blarney Woollen Mills carved out a niche in tweeds, woolen worsted cloths, knitting wools and hosiery. A fire at Christmas in 1869 saw the destruction of the mill. It was re-built the following year and still stands to this day. Business declined in the mid-20th century, and Blarney Woollen Mills closed in 1973.

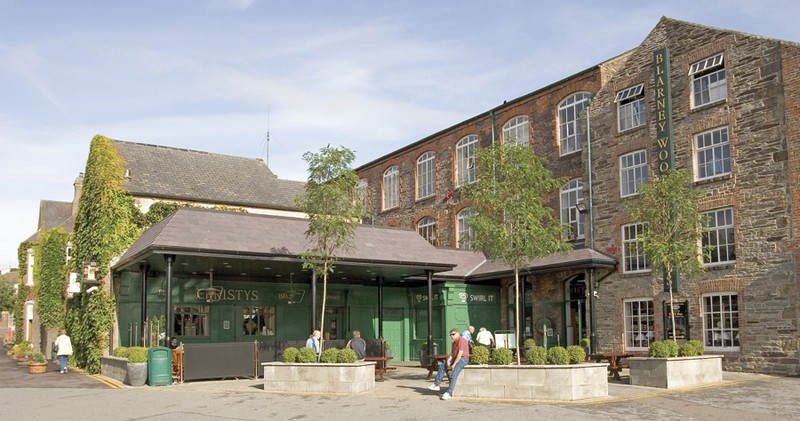
Blarney Woollen Mills shop entrance

=== Kelleher family ===
In 1928, at the age of 13 years, Christy Kelleher began work at the mill. Rising to supervisor with responsibility for the day-to-day running and maintenance of the heavy industrial machinery, he worked there for 22 years until 1950. In 1975, Kelleher bought and reopened the mills. He died in 1991, and the firm is still owned by the Kelleher family.
