= Leemount railway station =

Railway station in Ireland

Leemount

General information
- Location: Cork, County Cork; Ireland
- Coordinates: 51.8981°N 8.5712°W

History
- Original company: Cork and Muskerry Light Railway
- Pre-grouping: Cork and Muskerry Light Railway
- Post-grouping: Great Southern Railways

Key dates
- 8 August 1887: Station opens
- 31 December 1934: Station closes
Location

Leemount railway station was on the Cork and Muskerry Light Railway in County Cork, Ireland.

== History ==
The station opened on 8 August 1887.

Passenger services were withdrawn on 31 December 1934.

== Routes ==
Preceding station	Disused railways	Following station
Carrigrohane	Cork and Muskerry Light Railway; Cork-Coachford	Healy's Bridge
