= Wallace sisters =

Irish War of Independence secrets agents

Nora Wallace (1893– 17 September 1970) and Sheila Wallace (1887 – 14 April 1944) were business women who owned a newsagents on Brunswick Street, now known as St Augustine Street in Cork, who were also Intelligence officers for the IRA during the Irish War of Independence and used their premises as a meeting place and brigade headquarters.

== Biography ==
Nora and Sheila Wallace were born in Cork, Ireland. They grew up in Donoughmore before moving to Cork city in 1910. They were the daughters of Jeremiah and Mary Wallace (née Keeffe). They had eight other siblings. The family were Catholic, socialist and nationalist.

Nora and Sheila Wallace

The women ran a newsagents selling cigarettes, magazines and newspapers, as well as political pamphlets and periodicals which promoted Irish. Behind the scenes they were also involved in intelligence from 1916 up to the end of the War of Independence. The sisters became involved in the Irish Citizen Army and went on to establish a Women's Citizen Army in Cork. During the subsequent wars, both were also members of the Irish Republican Army. Both women were awarded pensions for their work as IRA Brigade officers.

Their shop was a central IRA Communications and organisational hub for the network from 1916 when the women carried dispatches during the Easter Rising until it was closed by British forces in May 1921. At that time, the women were ordered by the British forces to leave Cork. After the War of Independence, the sisters sided with the Republican side during the Irish Civil War.

Nora Wallace suffered ill health and TB as a result of her activities during the War of Independence and the Civil War. Her doctor's certification detailed this during her pension applications. Sheila held one of the highest ranks of a woman in the IRA as a Staff Officer. Spies were handled by the Wallace sisters where they coordinated them, ran their communications and gave them instructions and they also decoded British Army codes. The women acted as quartermasters keeping records of the armaments of the Brigade. Nora continued to work in the shop until 1960. Both sisters are buried in St. Finbarr's Cemetery.

Their activities have been covered in a number of documentaries including Ordinary Women in Extraordinary Times and The Little Shop of Secrets.
