= Blarney railway station =

Former terminus railway station at Blarney, Ireland

Blarney
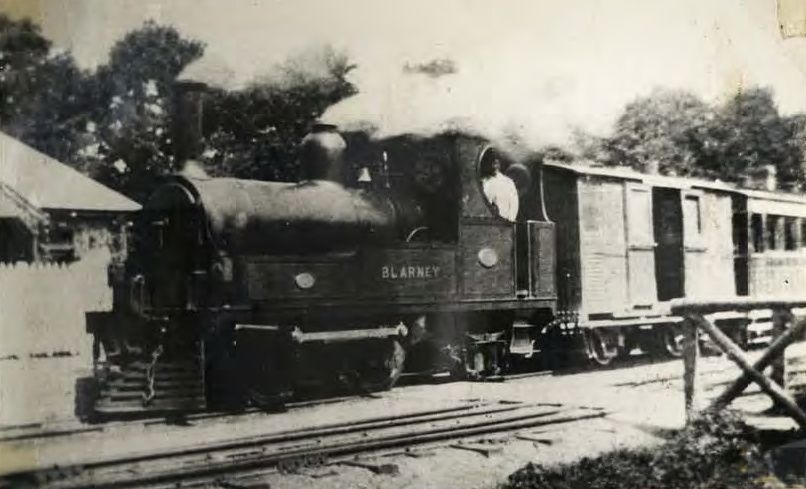
- Blarney at Blarney in 1888

General information
- Location: Blarney, County Cork; Ireland
- Coordinates: 51.9317°N 8.5680°W

History
- Original company: Cork and Muskerry Light Railway
- Pre-grouping: Cork and Muskerry Light Railway
- Post-grouping: Great Southern Railways

Key dates
- 8 August 1887: Station opens
- 31 December 1934: Station closes
Location

Blarney railway station was a terminus station on the Cork and Muskerry Light Railway (CMLR) in County Cork, Ireland. The station served Blarney, and was located on the south side of the town's main square, with Blarney Castle a short walk to the south west.

== History ==
The station opened on 8 August 1887 when the CMLR began public operations. Services were mostly one per two hours from 9am to 8pm, the first class return fare 1s 8p and the third class half that.

Passenger services were withdrawn on 31 December 1934.

== Layout and routes ==
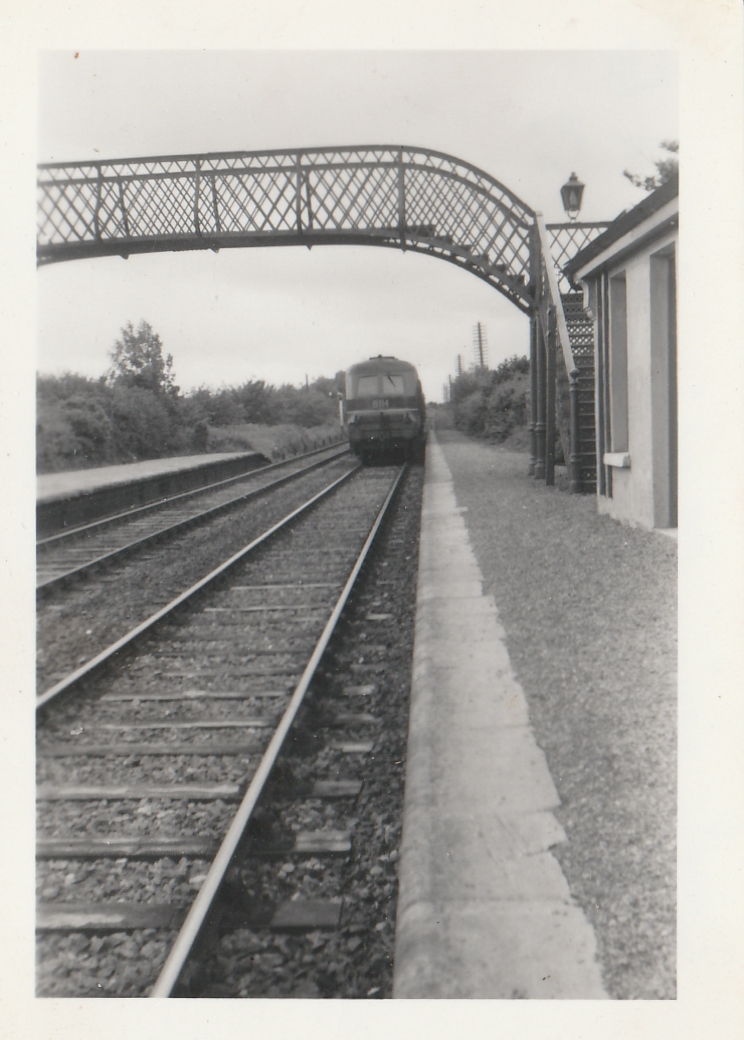
Diesel engine (B-114) pulling in to the station in July 1959

The station had a run-round loop, 3 dead end sidings, a turntable and a goods shed. Some of the station's structures remain, including the platform and station building, with the latter now occupied by a tourist gift shop.

Preceding station	Disused railways	Following station
St. Anne's	Cork and Muskerry Light Railway; Cork-Coachford	Terminus

== GS&WR Station ==
The Great Southern and Western Railway (GS&WR) also had a station serving Blarney on their Mallow to Cork section of main line which had been open since 18 October 1849 and which had already been responsible for vastly increasing the number of tourists. That station closed in 1963.
