= Tower, County Cork =

Village near Cork city, Ireland

Tower Teamhair (Irish)
- Town
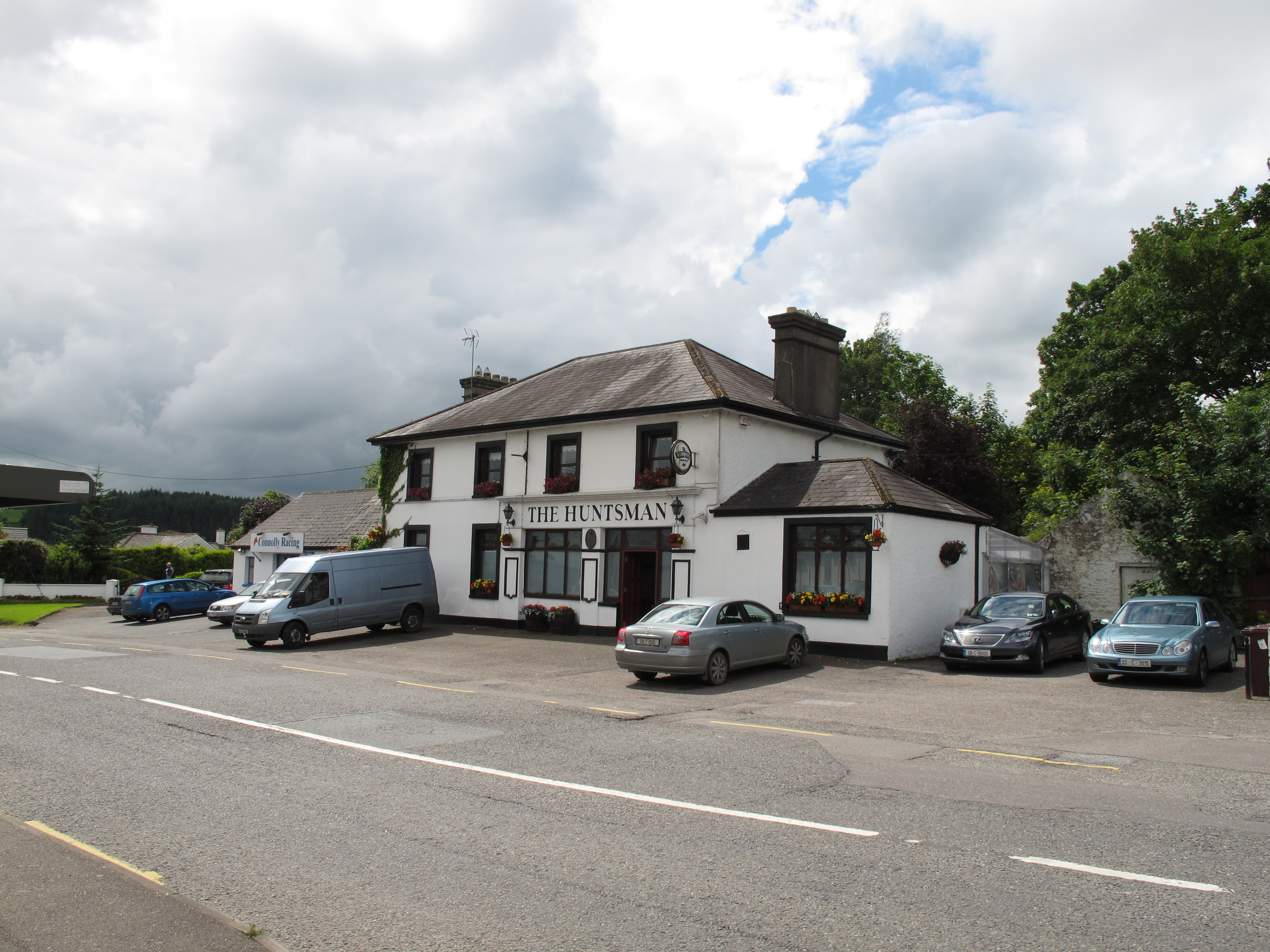
- The Huntsman pub

- Location in Ireland
- Coordinates: 51°55′30″N 8°36′29″W
- Country: Ireland
- Province: Munster
- County: County Cork
- Elevation: 40 m (130 ft)

Population (2022)
  - Total: 3,300
- Irish Grid Reference: W632766

Tower (Irish: Teamhair), Ordnance Survey Ireland name Model Village, is a village within the administrative area of Cork city in Ireland. It is located to the northwest of the city, approximately 3 km from the town of Blarney on the R617 road. Together with Blarney, Tower is a satellite or dormitory town of Cork city. Tower is part of the Dáil constituency of Cork North-Central. As of the 2022 census of Ireland, the village had a population of 3,300.

== History ==
The 1845 Ordnance Survey map shows a hamlet called Tower Village at the junction of the townlands of Coolflugh, Kilnamucky, and Cloghphilip in the civil parish of Matehy. By 1902, the Cork and Muskerry Light Railway (CMLR) branch line to Blarney had a station at Tower Bridge. This prompted development of a model village by O'Mahony Builders along what is now the Model Village Road. There was further growth in the Celtic Tiger era, with the population growing by 216% (from 1,402 to 3,032 people) between the censuses of 1991 and 2002. It grew more slowly thereafter, reaching 3,306 in 2011.

Originally located within the administrative area of Cork County Council, as part of the 2019 Cork boundary change, Tower (together with other "satellite towns" like Blarney and Glanmire) was brought within the administrative area of Cork City Council in mid-2019.

A health treatment facility, "St Ann's Hydropathic Establishment", was founded in the area in the 1840s. It was served by St. Anne's railway station on the CMLR, and described as having extensive grounds with "facilities for tennis, billiards, golf and fishing". It is "now in ruins".

== Features ==
Tower is in the Roman Catholic parish of Inniscarra. There are two pubs in the village and a SuperValu store.

== See also ==
- List of towns and villages in Ireland
- Metropolitan Cork
