= St. Anne's railway station =

Disused railway station in County Cork, Ireland

St Anne's

General information
- Location: County Cork; Ireland
- Coordinates: 51.9278°N 8.5983°W

History
- Opened: 8 August 1887
- Closed: 31 December 1934
- Original company: Cork and Muskerry Light Railway
- Pre-grouping: Cork and Muskerry Light Railway
- Post-grouping: Great Southern Railways
Location

St Anne's railway station, also known as St Ann's Hill station, was on the Cork and Muskerry Light Railway in County Cork, Ireland.

== History ==
The station was opened, in August 1887, close to "St Ann's Hydropathic Establishment" near Tower, County Cork. Passenger services were withdrawn on 31 December 1934.

== Routes ==
Preceding station	Disused railways	Following station
Tower Bridge	Cork and Muskerry Light Railway; Coachford Junction-Blarney	Blarney
Terminus	Donoughmore Extension Light Railway; St Anne's-Donoughmore	Burnt Mill
