= Donoughmore =

Donoughmore Domhnach Mór
- Parish
- Location in Ireland
- Coordinates: 51°59′N 8°45′W
- Country: Ireland
- Province: Munster
- County: County Cork

Area
  - Parish: 90.28 km^{2} (34.86 sq mi)
- Elevation Max: 383 m (1,257 ft)

Population (2011)
  - Rural: 2,725
- Time zone: UTC+0 (WET)
  - Summer (DST): UTC-1 (IST (WEST))
- Irish Grid Reference: W487822

Donoughmore (spelt Donaghmore by Ordnance Survey Ireland; Irish: Domhnach Mór) is a civil parish and a Catholic parish in County Cork, Ireland. This rural district lies 25 km (16 mi) west-northwest of Cork city. Donoughmore is divided between the Dáil constituencies of Cork North-Central and Cork North-West

== Geography ==
Boundaries of Donoughmore parish and its townlands

The area of Donoughmore is stated as 22,309 acres or 9,028 hectares.

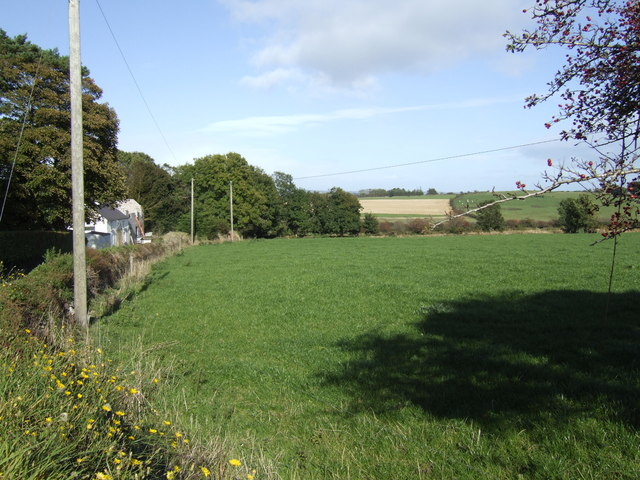
Farmland at Ballygirriha townland in Donoughmore

Donoughmore is subdivided into 40 townlands in total. Some are divided into north–south or Lower/Upper, etc.; counting the townlands without dividing them there are 32 townlands in total. Some townlands are under the care of Rylane Post Office and as such have Rylane as a postal address instead of Donoughmore. The following list is from largest to smallest (spelling follows the Ordnance Survey, local spellings may differ): Barrahaurin, Gowlane North, Pluckanes North, Meenahony, Kilcullen South, Coolmona, Kilcullen North, Ahadillane, Garraun North, Ballygirriha, Fornaght, Ballycunningham, Derry, Gowlane South, Coollicka, Garraun South, Killeenleigh, Lackabane, Rathcoola East, Rathcoola West, Garraunredmond, Commeenaplaw, Bunkilla, Monataggart, Kilmartin Lower, Pluckanes East, Pluckanes West, Knockanare, Kilmartin Upper, Knockarourke, Curragh, Ballykerwick, Firmount, Ballycraheen, Scarteen, Knockane, Monavanshere, Pluckanes South, Ballyhennessy, Ballyvodane. The village of Stuake lies at the north end of the parish.

Donoughmore is, like most of County Cork, in the South Western River basin district. Within this district it is in the Lower Lee–Owenboy Water Management Unit.

Donoughmore lies partly in the Boggeragh Mountain range. Uctough, Toureen and Knockagoun are the only three mountains from the range that are in Donoughmore. Uctough's peak at 358 m (1,175 ft) lies within the parish bounds, along with Toureen's peak at 379 m (1,243 ft). whilst Knockagoun's peak is outside the parish bounds, but within the parish it reaches between 342 m (1,122 ft) and 386 m (1,266 ft). Other less prominent peaks such as Mossy Bed 348–383 m (1,142–1,257 ft), Bert Hill 365 m (1,198 ft), Cummeen 359 m (1,178 ft), Barrachauring 383 m (1,257 ft), Kilcullen Hill 235–309 m (771–1,014 ft), Knockyrourke 258 m (846 ft), Rathcoola Mountain 242 m (794 ft), Ahadillane Hill 235 m (771 ft), Pluckanes 224 m (735 ft), Hurley or Gowlane Hill 233 m (764 ft), Meenachoney 368 m (1,207 ft).

Donoughmore's Garda jurisdiction is the Stuake Sub-District, of the Macroom District, in the Cork West Division of the Southern Region.

Donoughmore is in the Macroom Electoral Area of Cork County Council.

== History ==
There are a number of standing stones and ring forts in the Donoughmore area. Some of the stones have examples of the Ogham script engraved on them. At least 3 Ogham stones found in Donoughmore are now on display in the National Museum of Ireland

During the Lordship and Kingdom of Ireland periods. A peerage system was established in Ireland to help with the administration of English rule. One of these titles, the Earl of Donoughmore, takes its name from the parish. The story is that Francis Hely of neighbouring Kilshannig conformed to the established religion, and after doing so he was able to marry a Protestant woman named Prudence Earbery, the daughter of Mathias Earbery, a lease owner in Donoughmore. Their son John Hely married a woman by the name of Christina Nixon, who was an heiress to her grand-uncle Richard Hutchinson. After marriage he took the name of John Hely-Hutchinson. He became a politician and provost of Trinity College Dublin. Using his position he got his wife a peerage, and she took the name of his homeland as her title even though she did not live there but in Knocklofty, Tipperary. She became Baroness Donoughmore of Knocklofty and her son Richard Hely-Hutchinson became the first Baron Donoughmore and later, after supporting the Act Of Union, he became the Earl.

When Ireland was divided into baronies Donoughmore was a part of Muskerry East.

Three passengers on the Titanic were from Donoughmore. They were William Doherty, Hannah Naughton and William Foley.

When Irish politicians tried to achieve Home rule for Ireland the Irish Volunteers were formed. Donoughmore had its own company. This company was mobilised the Sunday of the Easter Rising and marched to nearby Bweeng where they met members of other companies. Engaging in drills they were eventually told to go home by Tomás Mac Curtain.

In the Irish War of Independence, the Donoughmore company of the Volunteers morphed into the Donoughmore Battalion of the I.R.A. Notable during this period was the execution of Major Compton Smith by the Donoughmore Battalion. The major had been captured in the hope of exchanging him for IRA prisoners. When the IRA prisoners were executed instead of being released, the decision was made to execute the major. The manner in which he accepted his faith holding no ill will to his captors and including writing a letter to his wife with the opening words 'My own darling little wife, I'm to be shot in an hour' left a mark on many, including Michael Collins, who went to great lengths to retrieve the location of his body. The Wallace sisters, IRA Intelligence officers, were also from the Donoughmore area.

During the Irish Civil War, the Donoughmore Battalion fought for the anti-treaty side and three members of the battalion were killed. Two of these, Denis Creedon and John O Brien, were killed in a fight with Free State forces on 14 September 1922. The third, William Healy, was executed in Cork Gaol on 13 March 1923.

Donoughmore was electrified beginning in May 1953, the process was finished 8 months later in January 1954.

The Rathcoola Residency was an art programme for established Australian or New Zealand writers or artists where successful applicants received A$20,000 and six months accommodation at Rathcoola House in Donoughmore on condition that after the six months one piece of literature or art must be donated to the trust that runs the residency.

== Population ==
In the Irish census system, parishes do not have data collected for them as such. Instead, a unit of area called an electoral division is used. In rural contexts, such electoral districts are usually calculated by grouping townlands together. Donoughmore consists of 3 electoral divisions: Firmount, Gowlane and Kilcullen.

	Population	Change
1901	2695	n/a
1911	2425	−10%
2002	2062	−15%
2006	2392	+16%
2011	2633	+10%
2016	2725	+3.5%

== Education ==
Donoughmore has two primary schools: Scoil Iósaif and St. Lachteen's. There were previously a number of other schools within the parish, including Rathcoola School.

== Transportation ==
Donoughmore was formerly linked with Cork City by the narrow gauge Cork and Muskerry Light Railway. There were stops at Burnt Mill, Fox's Bridge, Knockane, Firmount and Donoughmore. Donoughmore railway station opened in 1893 but closed in 1934. It was situated at the bottom of New Tipperary.

There are two regional roads in Donoughmore, the R619 and the R579. During the 18th century and 19th century, specialist roads were built for various reasons. Cork city had a thriving butter market at the time and roads were built to places in Kerry to better facilitate this trade. One of these, locally called the 'Old Kerry Road' was one such 'Butter Road'. It consists of the largest section of continually straight road within the parish.

== Religion ==
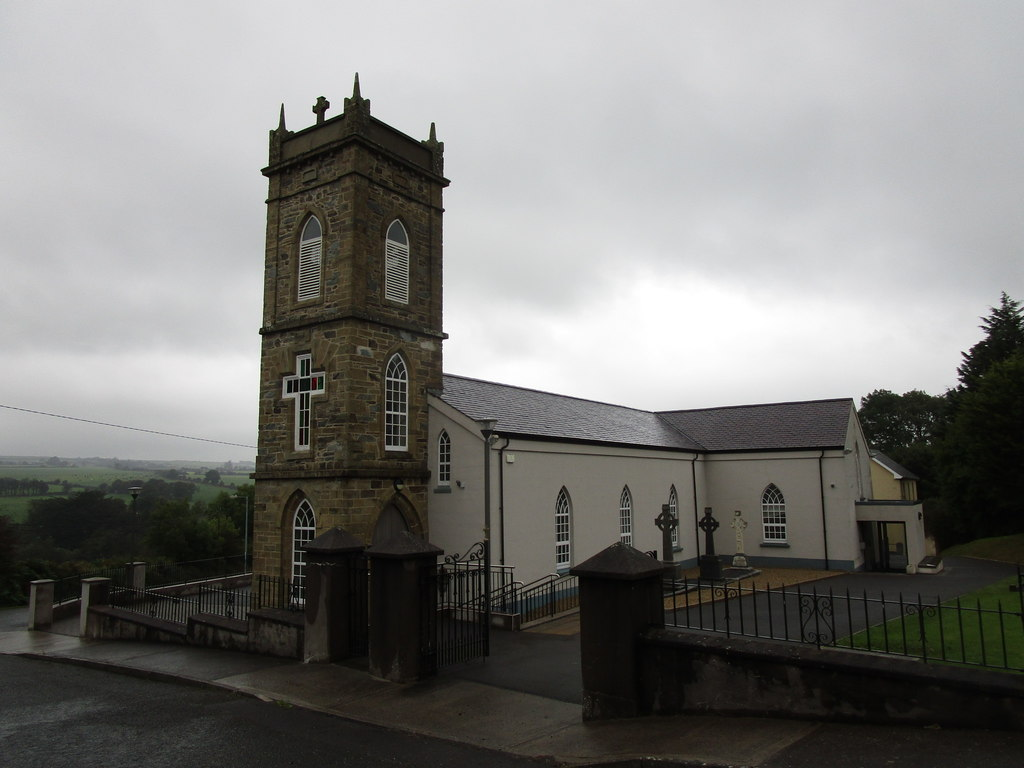
St. Joseph's Catholic church in Donoughmore parish

Donoughmore civil parish is coterminous with the Roman Catholic parish which has two functioning churches: St. Josephs and St. Lachteen's. These churches are in the Catholic Diocese of Cloyne. A Church of Ireland church existed in the parish until the 1960s, when it was deconsecrated. The building was later used as a garage. Although the Church of Ireland church is now gone, the title of Prebendary of Donoughmore still exists. As of 2021, the prebendary was the Revd Dennis MacCarthy, rector of Bandon union of parishes.

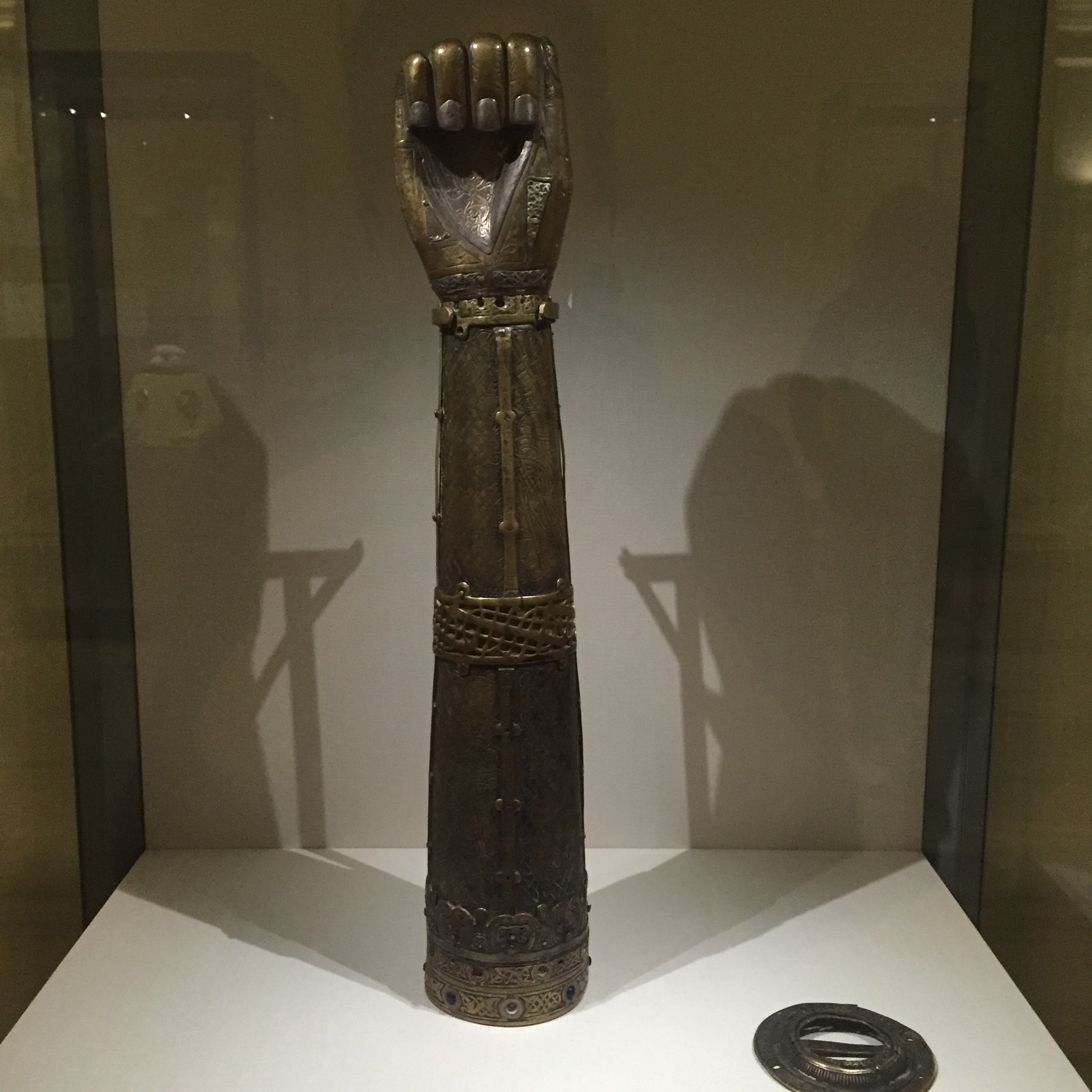
Shrine of Saint Lachtin's Arm

At Donoughmore Cross there is also the ruins of a very old church. This church is the origin of the Shrine of Saint Lachtin's Arm. This shrine now resides in the National Museum of Ireland and is a hollow bronze sculpture of an arm and hand. The shrine contains wood which itself contains a small cavity that would have held a relic at one time.

After the Rev John Buckley became parish priest of neighbouring Grenagh in 1869 he came to the conviction that his parish was too small. As a result, he requested a transfer of land to Grenagh from Inniscarra and Donoughmore. Whilst he was allowed to take the land surrounding present day Courtbrack from Inniscarra he was denied his request for the Donoughmore townlands of Ballycraheen and part of Garraun South.

Two American Roman Catholic Bishops have been born in Donoughmore. John Tuigg Bishop of Pittsburgh and Bishop Denis J. O'Connell the Bishop of Richmond in Virginia was born in Donoughmore.

A native of Donoughmore subsequently became the first person from County Cork to be ordained a Minister at the Trinity Presbyterian Church Cork since the church was built in 1861.

== Sport ==
Gaelic games are popular in the area. The local GAA club, Donoughmore GAA, is a dual code club which plays both hurling and Gaelic football. The club plays in the Muskery (often called Mid-Cork) division of Cork.

The Ladies' footballers won the Senior All-Ireland in 2001 and 2003 and being runners up twice in 2004 and 2009. One of the team, Juliet Murphy, is considered one of the greatest Ladies footballers ever, captaining the Cork senior ladies' football team to all Ireland victory 3 times and winning herself 8 all Ireland medals with them.

In the men's, the footballers have been the runners up in the Junior A Mid-Cork championship nine times in 1953, 1956, 1957, 1962, 1976, 1981, 1982, 1993 and 2000 but winning in 1952, 1983, 1998 and 2011. In 1983 they went on to win that year's County championship. The Junior A Hurlers have reached the Mid-Cork final on seven occasions in 1933, 1935, 1943, 1952, 2001, 2008 and 2013- although the title has eluded them so far.

The local association football (soccer) team is named Donoughmore Athletic, Founded in 1995 the team plays in the Cork AUL league. It's honours so far are winning Division 3 in 98/99, and being runners up in Division 2A in 08/09 and runners up in Division 2 in 12/13.

There is also an athletic club, a Tug-o-war club, and a Basketball club - which won the 2007 National league Division one Championship. A new baseball club, the "Druids", was formed in Donoughmore in 2004. Hare coursing, road bowling also take place in Donoughmore.

In several of the above sports, the jerseys of Donoughmore clubs include a combination of black and white, with black being the dominant colour.
