= Gurteen Beach =

Beach in County Galway, Ireland

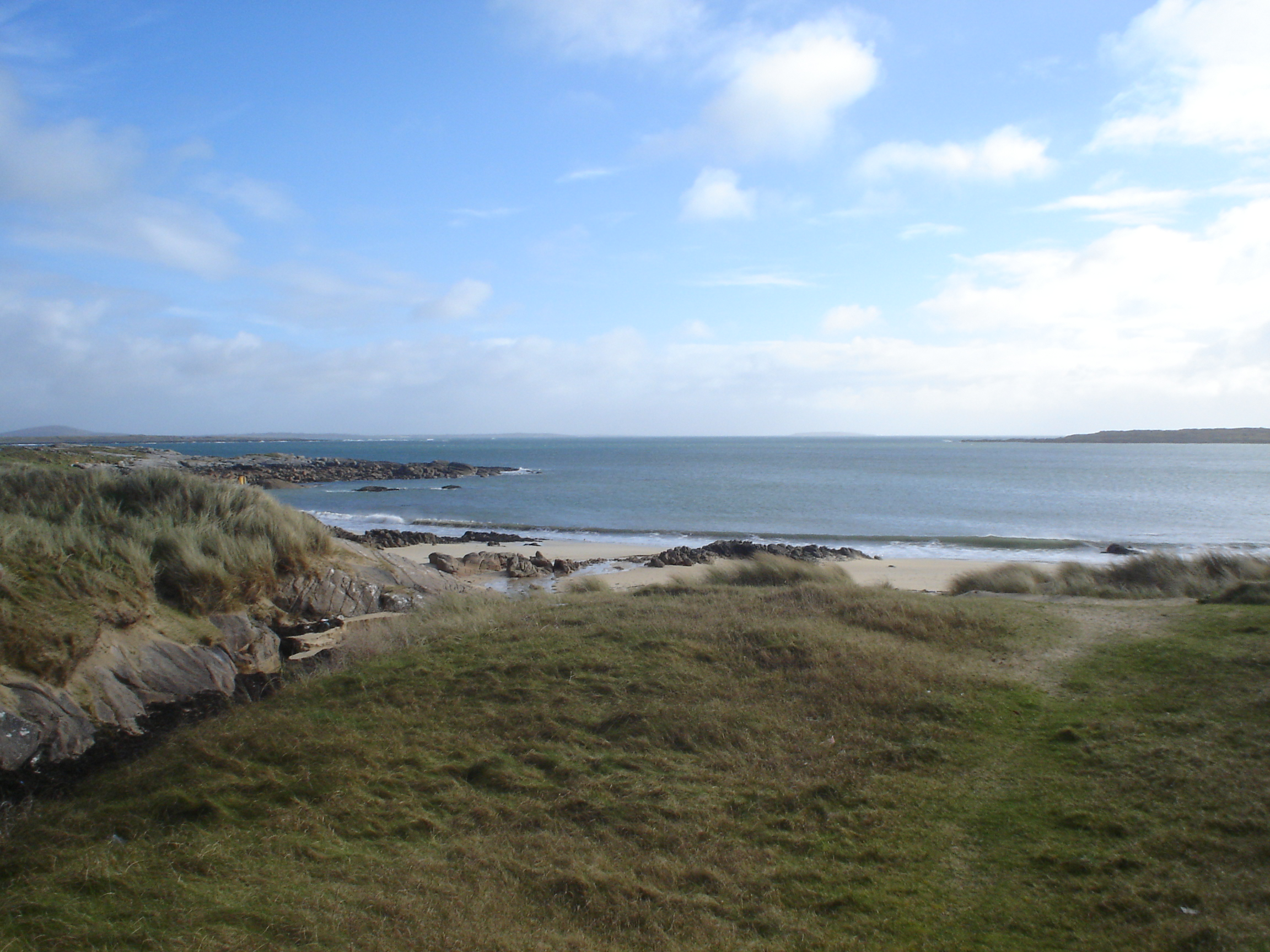
Trá na Feadóige (Gurteen Beach)

Trá na Feadóige (Irish, literally "beach of the plover"), known in English as Gurteen Beach, is a beach located near Roundstone, County Galway, in the Connemara region of the west of Ireland, lying back-to-back with Dog's Bay (known in Irish as Trá Chuan an Mhada). The two beaches were formed by a sand spit and tombolo which now separates the two bays known as Gurteen Bay and Dog's Bay. The name Gurteen derives from the Irish Goirtín meaning small plot or small field. The beach is located within the Gaeltacht of Conamara Theas.

The area is internationally important for its rare and interesting ecological, geological and archaeological features. The sand and grassland habitats are of particular interest. According to Robert Lloyd Praeger, the sand was not formed from rocks, but from shells of tiny sea creatures known as foraminifera. This is an exaggeration, as much of the sand is made of small fragments of calcareous shells of molluscs, siliceous fragments of sponges, and other fragments of animal skeletons. The grasslands, made up of machair vegetation is considered rare and only known to be found on the west coast of Ireland and Scotland.

The Roundstone beaches are also important as an example of practical community led nature conservation. The area had been seriously threatened by erosion up until the early 1990s. However, extensive efforts on behalf of the local beach restoration committee and local community have helped to re-establish the sand dunes on the tombolo and the headland and to preserve the very special character of the area.
