= Monard, County Cork =

Monard
- Townland
- Location in Ireland
- Coordinates: 51°56′00″N 08°30′00″W
- Country: Ireland
- Province: Munster
- County: County Cork

Population (2011)
  - Total: 196

Monard (Irish: An Mhóin Ard, meaning 'high bogland') is a largely rural townland in the civil parish of Whitechurch to the north-west of Cork City in Ireland.

== Population and land use ==
At the turn of the 20th century, the townland had a population of approximately 200 people.

By the early 21st century, it was proposed to develop a planned settlement on "greenfield agricultural land" in the area. Covering 966 acres (3.91 km^{2}) and containing 5,000 dwellings, schools, a medical centre and other facilities, this settlement was proposed to service a population of 13,000 people. Similar in concept to Adamstown, Dublin, the planning application called for the settlement to be based on three villages and a town centre, built around a new railway station. Due to the fallout from the Irish property bubble and planning challenges, the development was significantly delayed, with approval only finally given in June 2016.

As of the 2011 census, Monard townland had a population of 196 people.

== Train station ==
The 2001 planning proposal called for a railway station, serving the projected residential development, to be located at the Rathpeacon siding on the Dublin-Cork mainline. In June 2016, the planning authority, An Bord Pleanála, stated that construction on housing within the 'Monard Strategic Development Zone' could not commence until the completion of this proposed station. As of 2018, no works on the proposed Monard train station had commenced, with no funding allocated in the National Development Plan for the period 2018-2027. The Cork Metropolitan Area Draft Transport Strategy 2040, a public consultation document published by the National Transport Authority in May 2019, included Monard as one of several potential locations for future stations in the area.
