= John's Burnt Mill Bridge =

Historic arc bridge in Pennsylvania, US

- U.S. National Register of Historic Places
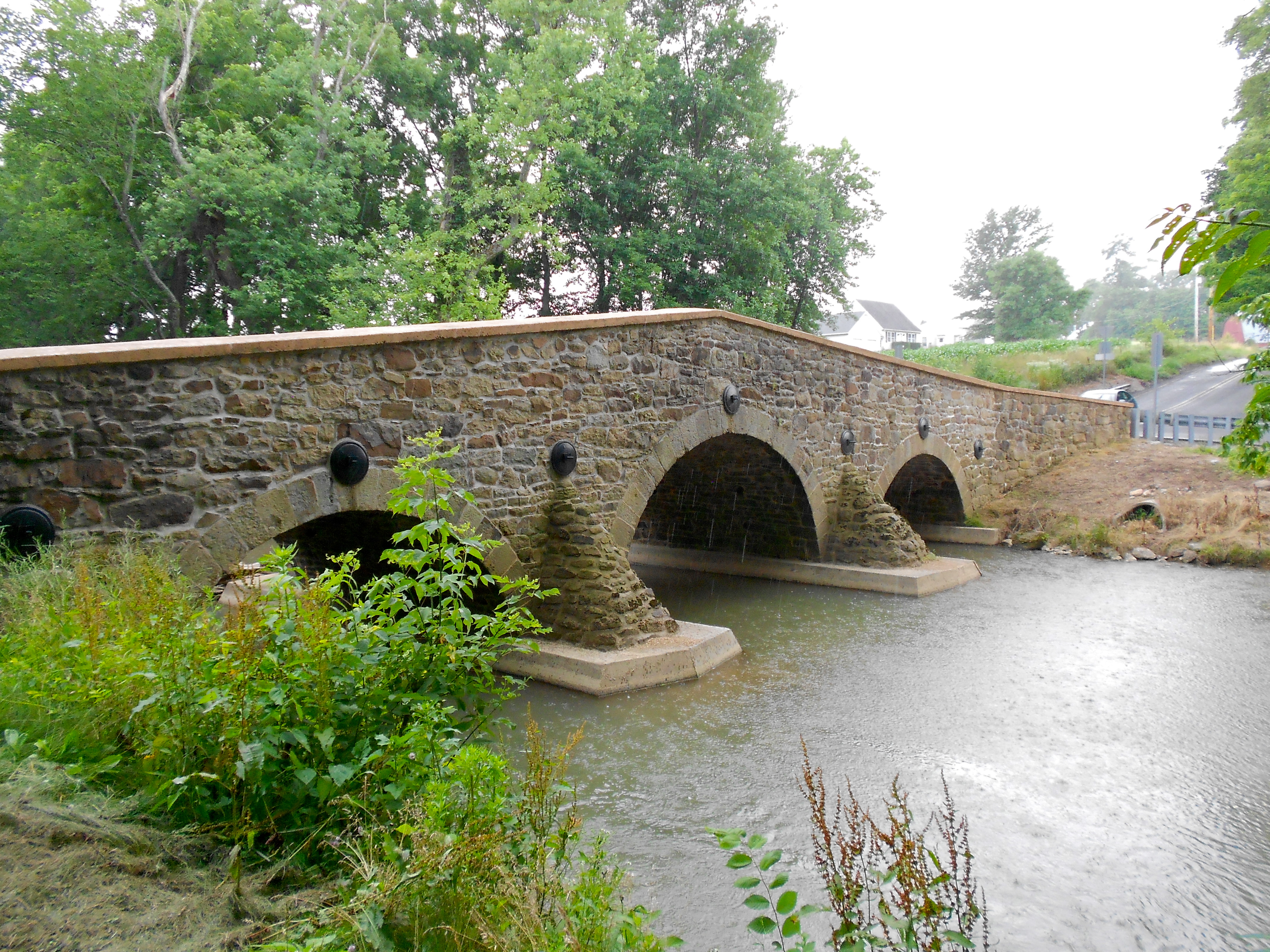

- Location within Pennsylvania Location within the United States
- Location: SW of New Oxford on T 428, Mount Pleasant Township, Pennsylvania
- Coordinates: 39°49′57″N 77°4′47″W
- Area: less than one acre
- Built: 1800
- Architectural style: Camelback
- NRHP reference No.: 74001731
- Added to NRHP: December 16, 1974

John's Burnt Mill Bridge, also known as Camelback Bridge, is a historic stone arch bridge in Mount Pleasant Township, Adams County, Pennsylvania, United States. It was built between 1800 and 1823, and is a 75-foot-long (23 m), triple-arched fieldstone bridge. The bridge crosses the South Branch Conewago Creek.

It was added to the National Register of Historic Places in 1974.
