= Blarney =

Town in County Cork, Ireland

Blarney An Bhlarna
- Town
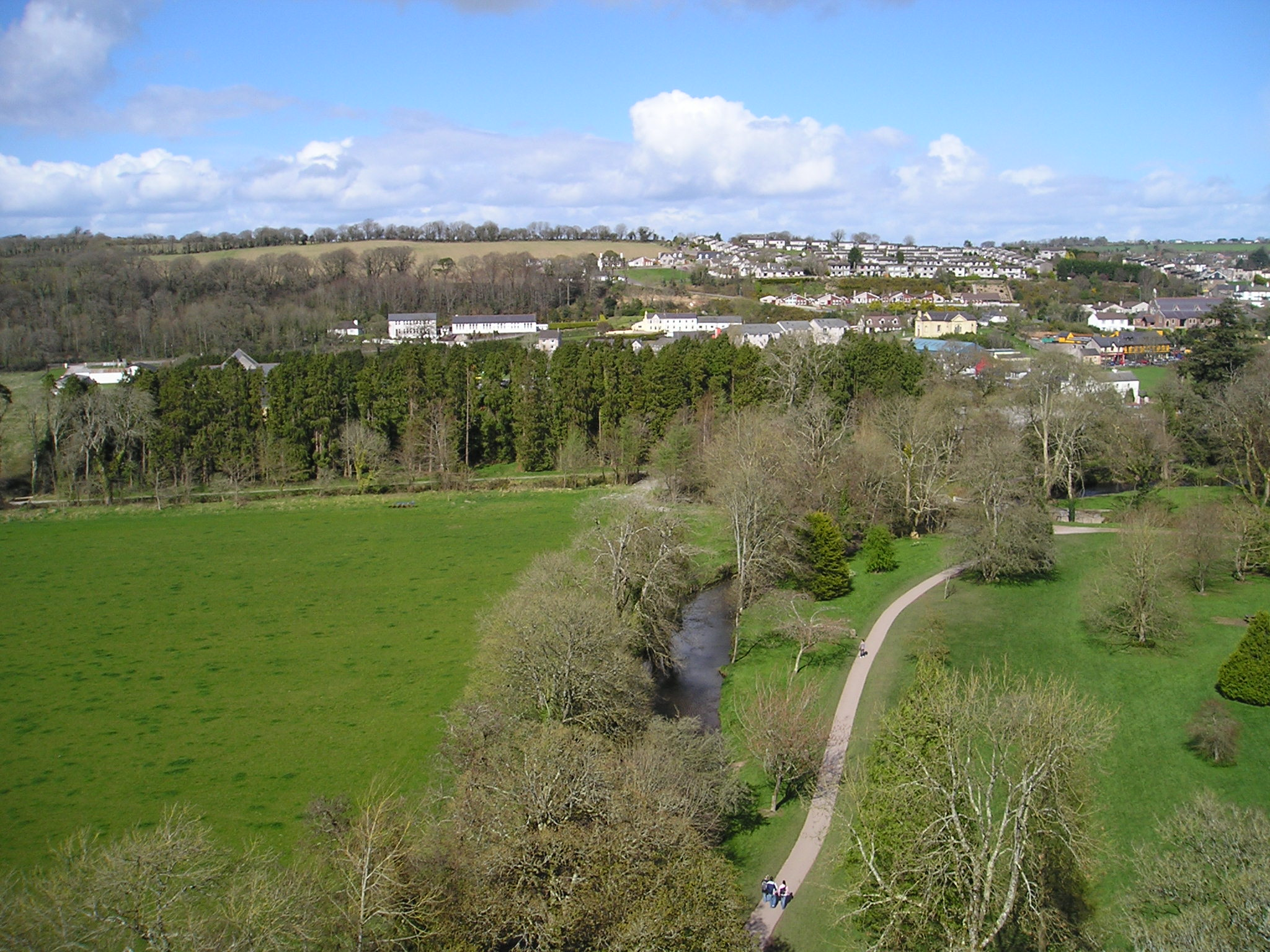
- The countryside around Blarney

- Location in Ireland
- Coordinates: 51°55′59″N 8°34′5″W
- Country: Ireland
- Province: Munster
- County: County Cork
- Elevation: 55 m (180 ft)

Population (2022)
  - Total: 2,779
- Irish Grid Reference: W610759

Blarney (Irish: An Bhlarna, meaning 'the little field') is a suburban town within the administrative area of Cork City in Ireland. It is located approximately 8 kilometres (5 mi) north-west of the city centre. It is the site of Blarney Castle, home of the legendary Blarney Stone. Blarney is part of the Dáil constituency of Cork North-Central. It is surrounded by the suburban villages of Tower, Cloghroe and Kerry Pike, all on the outskirts of Cork City.

== Tourism ==
Blarney town is a major tourist attraction in Cork. Mostly people come to see the castle, kiss the stone, and to shop at the Blarney Woollen Mills.

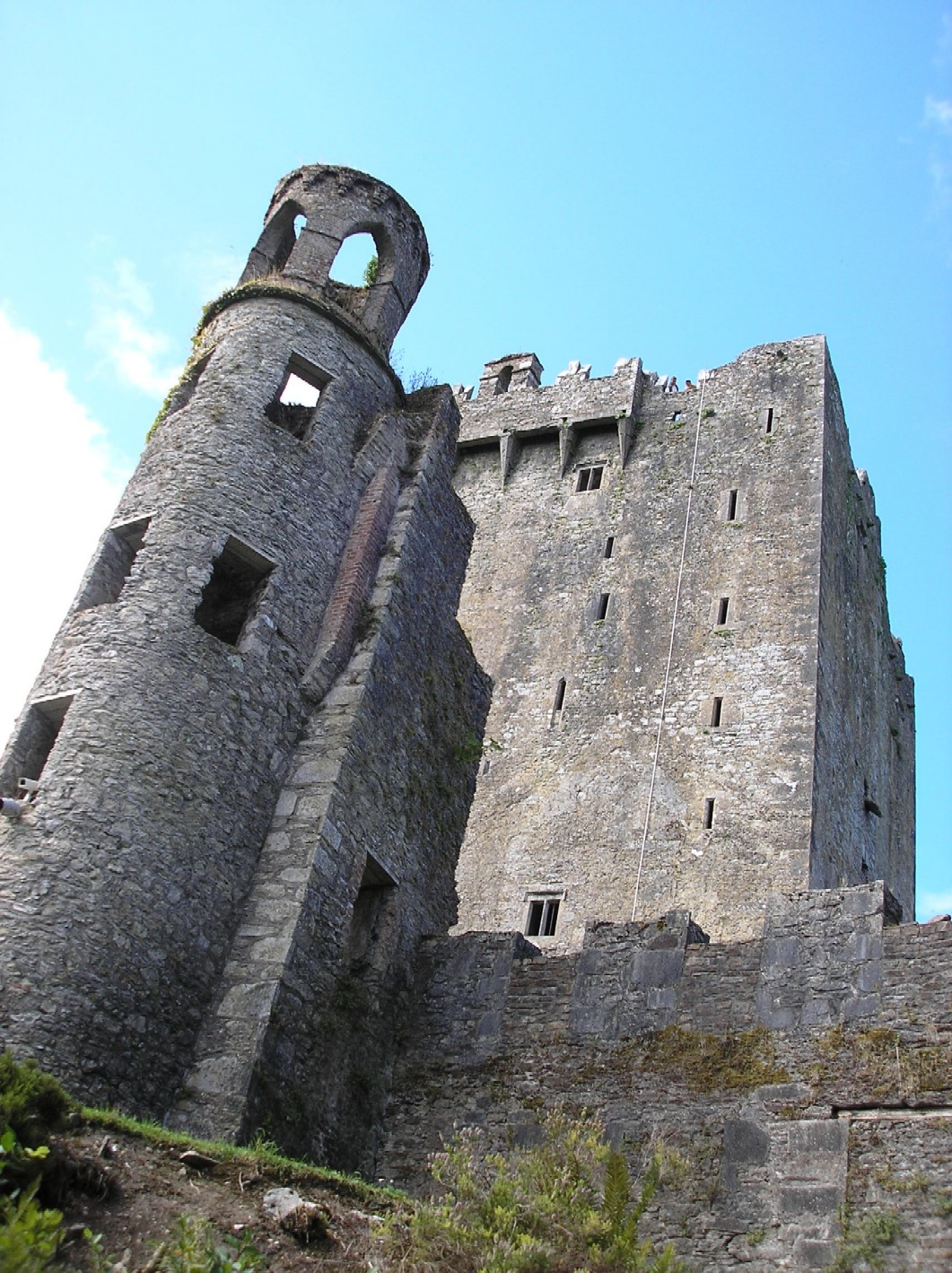
Blarney Castle

=== Blarney Stone ===
By kissing the Blarney Stone at Blarney Castle, it is claimed that one can receive the "Gift of the Gab" (eloquence, or skill at flattery or persuasion). The legend has several suggested roots, involving members of the MacCarthy dynasty – builders and original owners of Blarney Castle.

=== Blarney Woollen Mills ===
Built in 1823, Blarney Woollen Mills was originally known as Mahony's Mills. It was a water-powered mill, producing mainly tweeds and woollens. After closing in the early 1970s, the mills was re-invented by local entrepreneur Christy Kelleher as a gift store servicing tourists visiting the village.

=== Square ===
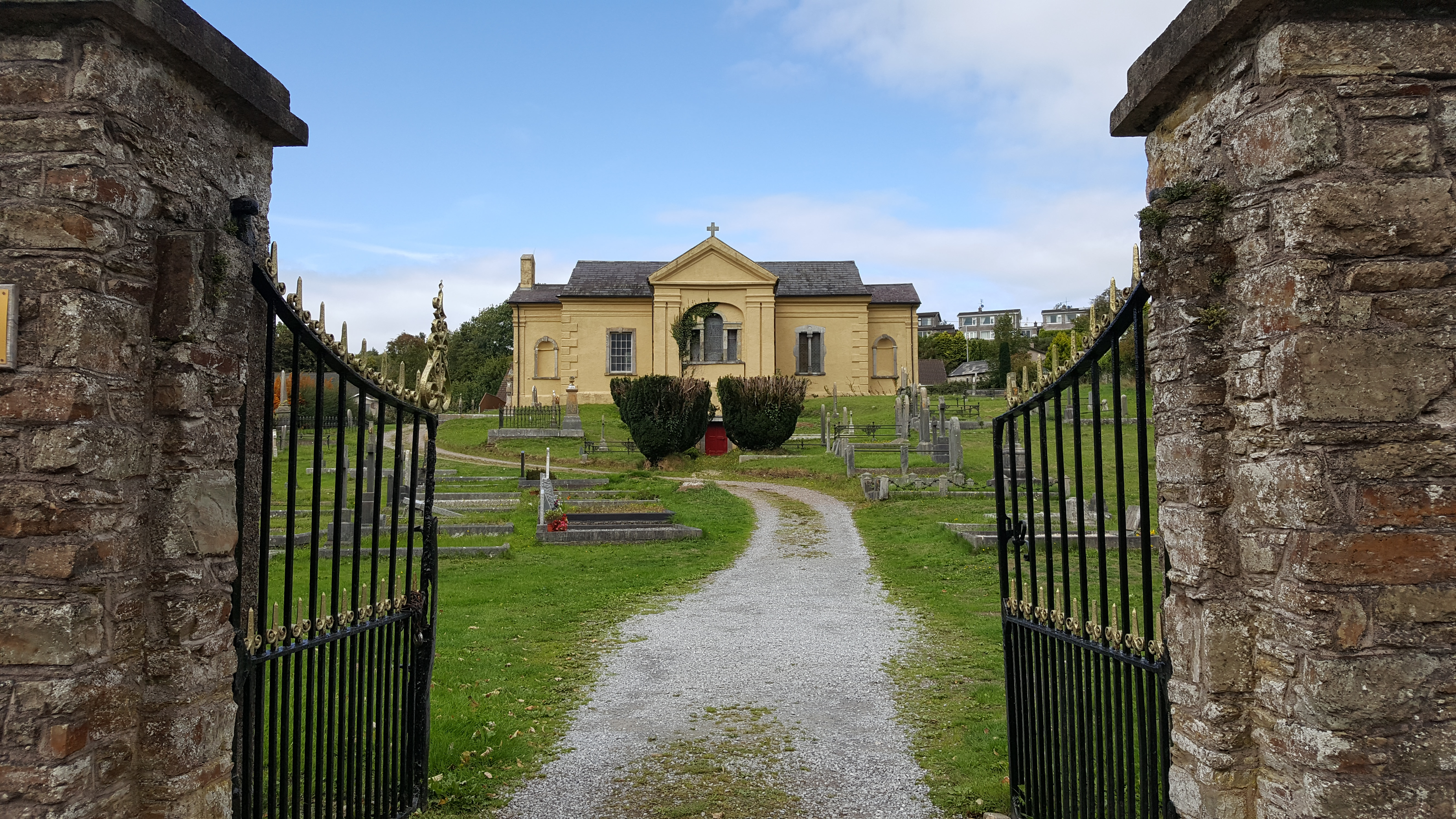
The Church of Ireland (Anglican) Church of the Resurrection lies off Blarney's town square

The Square in the centre of the village is a grass field where Blarney locals and townspeople sometimes congregate during the summer. Several attempts to develop the square, over the years, have always been met with stiff objection from the locals. Previously, the square was used for markets.

== Transport ==
Blarney formerly had its own narrow gauge railway station. The Cork and Muskerry Light Railway linked Blarney (CMLR) railway station with Cork; it opened in 1887 but closed on 29 December 1934. As of 2016, a proposed new station at Blarney (originally due for service some years previously on the Dublin-Cork railway line) remained in the proposal phase.

The town is served by a number of Bus Éireann services, including the number 215 bus every half an hour from Mahon Point via Cork city centre and the number 235 bus from Cork city at a lesser frequency.

The nearest airport is Cork Airport.

== Economy and media ==
The Blarney economy is dependent on the largely US tourism trade, with numerous hotels and guest houses in the area to serve demand.

The Muskerry News is the local paper for Blarney and surrounding areas and is printed monthly. Local radio stations that can be picked up in the Blarney area are RedFM, C103, 96FM and CUH FM.

== Demographics ==
Originally administered by Cork County Council, following the 2019 Cork boundary change, Blarney is within the administrative area of Cork City Council.

As of the 2022 census, the town of Blarney had a population of 2,779. Of these, 85% were white Irish, 0% white Irish travellers, 7.5% other white ethnicities, less than 1% black, 2.5% Asian, with less than 1% other ethnicities or no stated ethnicity. In term of religion, Blarney was 77% Catholic, 4.3% other stated religion, 18% no religion, with less than 4.3% not stating a religion.

== Education ==
There is a Roman Catholic mixed primary school, Scoil Chroí Íosa, which caters for approximately 300 pupils and was formed following the amalgamation of the former boys and girls schools in August 2012.

Gaelscoil Mhuscraí is an Irish language primary school in the village. Established in 2002, as of the 2022 school year, it had approximately 170 pupils.

Blarney is also the home of a secondary school called Scoil Mhuire Gan Smál which was established in the 1950s. As of August 2022, it had over 800 students enrolled.

== Sport and leisure ==
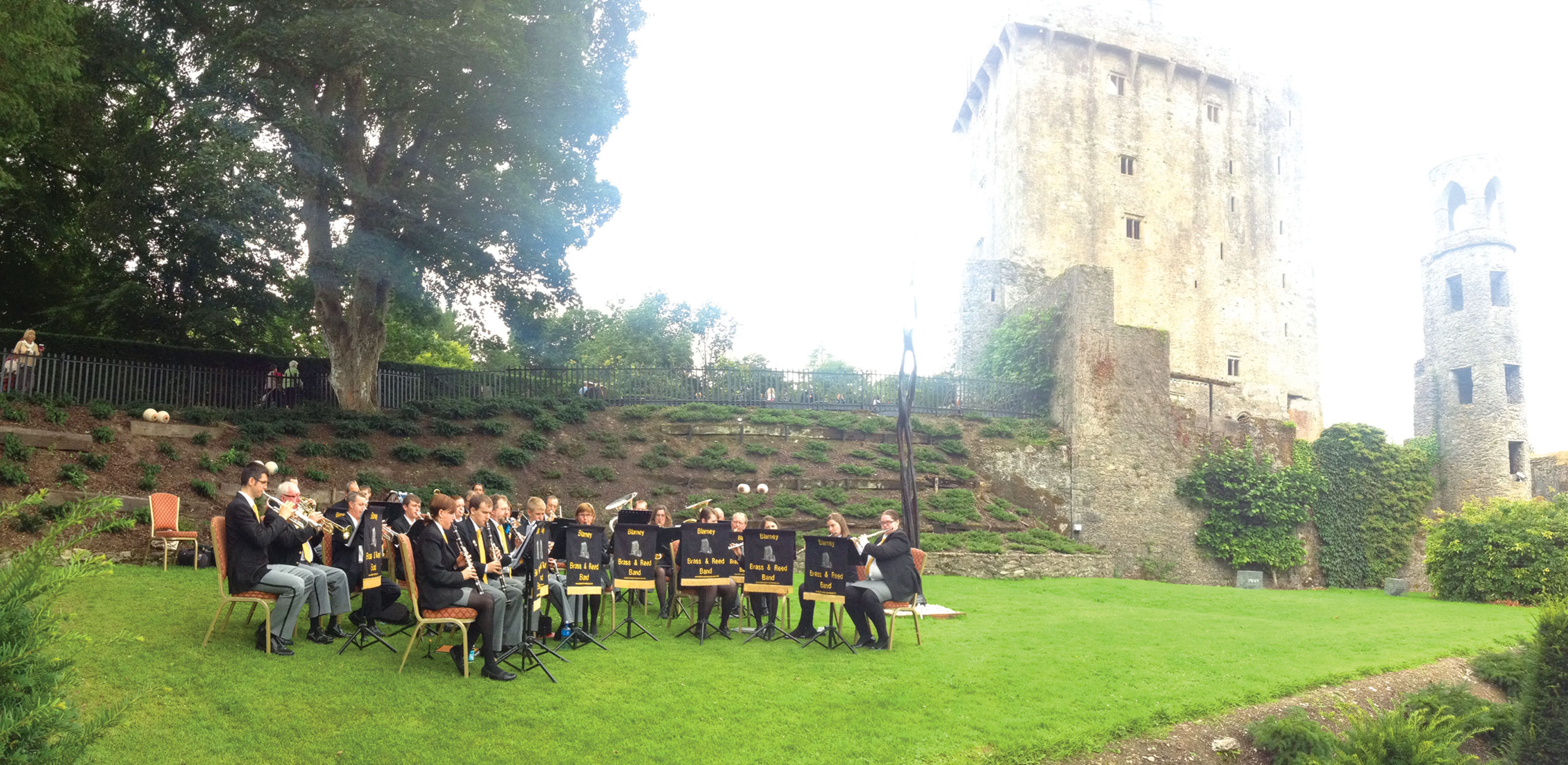
Blarney Brass and Reed Band at Blarney Castle

In sport, the local soccer club, Blarney United FC, has playing facilities close to the village, with both a traditional grass pitch and an all-weather pitch. The pitches are supported by changing facilities, a meeting room and a hospitality room. The senior team competes in the Premier Division of the Munster Senior League. The town's GAA club, Blarney GAA, were All-Ireland Intermediate Hurling Champions in 2009 and Cork-County Intermediate Hurling Champions in 2008. Blarney also fields a Camogie team, which was established again in 1999. The local cycling club was re-formed in 2010.

In music, the Blarney Brass and Reed Band was formed in 1981 by a group of locals who wished to form a community musical group spanning multiple age groups. The band has a music education program and won events at the South of Ireland Band Championships in 2010 and 2011.

The local Scouting Ireland group, the 45th Cork (Blarney), has a particular emphasis on camping and hillwalking.

== See also ==
- List of towns and villages in Ireland
