= Cork and Muskerry Light Railway =

Closed Irish light railway

- A train at Carrigrohane station

Overview
- Locale: County Cork, Ireland
- Coordinates: 51.8961°N 8.4836°W (Cork Western Road terminus)

Technical
- Line length: 17 miles 60 chains (28.6 km)
- Track length: 18 miles 45 chains (29.9 km)
- Track gauge: 914 mm (3 ft)
Lines owned by CMLR.
Donoughmore Extension Light Railway (worked by CMLR)

The Cork and Muskerry Light Railway (CMLR) was a 3 ft (914 mm) narrow gauge railway in County Cork, Ireland. The first part of the railway opened in 1887 and closed in 1934. A major reason for building the railway was to exploit tourist traffic to Blarney Castle.

== Initial route ==
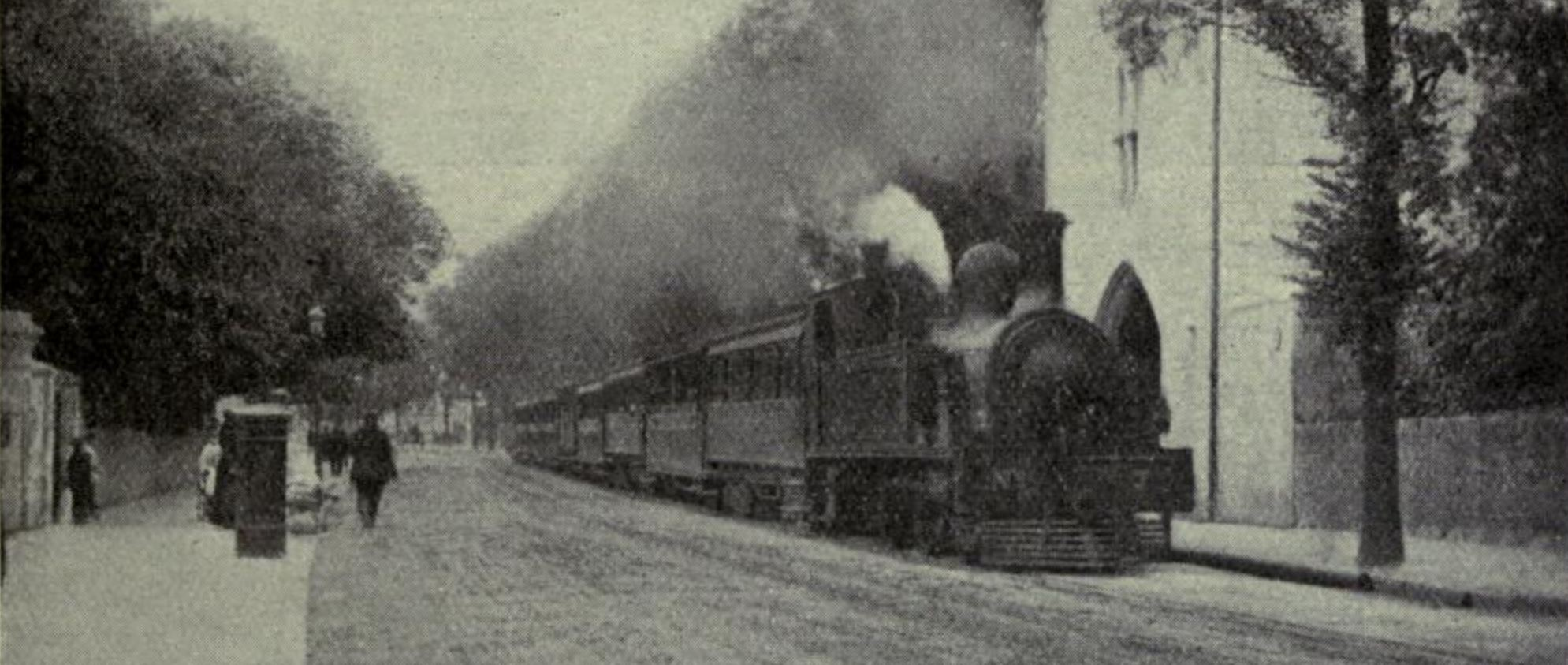
CMLR train leaving Cork via the Western Road

The Cork and Muskerry Light Railway operated from its own station, the Cork Western Road railway station, in Cork city. The initial lines westwards from Cork to Blarney and Coachford opened in 1887 and 1888 respectively. The railway operated as a roadside tramway, and the locomotives were fitted with cowcatchers. The railway was built close to the south bank of the River Lee until before the station at Leemount. After Leemount it swung north to follow the River Shournagh into a narrow and winding valley, before entering the valley in which Blarney sits, where the station Coachford Junction was located, 6 1/2 miles (10.5 km) west of Cork. From Coachford Junction the branch to the Blarney line terminus station was 2 miles (3 km), and the line to the terminus station at Coachford was 9 miles (14 km).

Throughout the railway's existence, the line was equipped with nine steam locomotives.

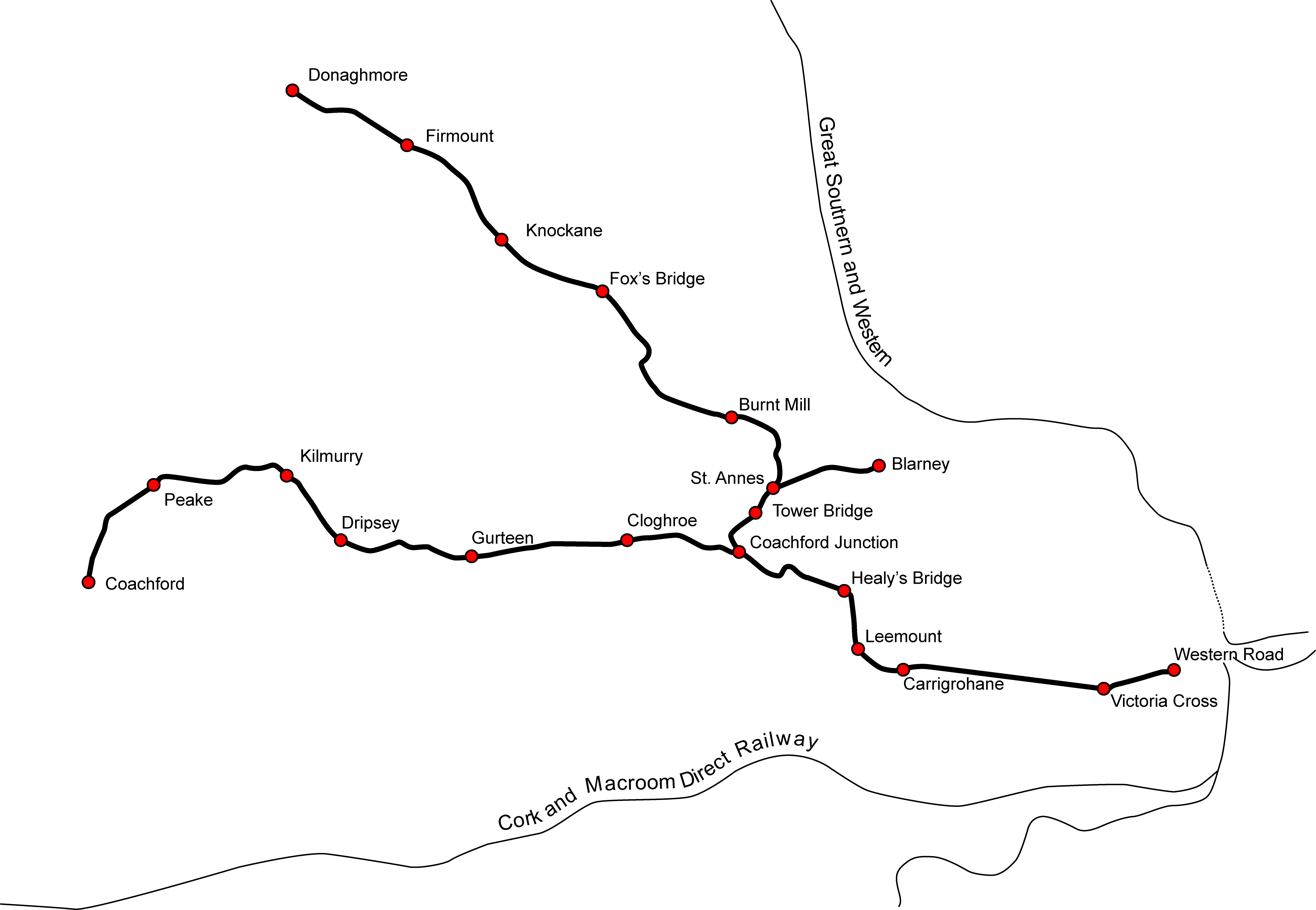
Map of the railway with stations

The Cork Electric Tramways and Lighting Company was later to share railways' line out of Cork city.

== Donoughmore extension ==
An 8 1/2-mile-long (14 km) extension was built north-westerly from St Annes (on the Blarney branch) to Donoughmore. The line was opened in 1893. It was legally a separate company (the Donoughmore Extension Light Railway Company, incorporated in 1889) but worked as a part of the Cork and Muskerry Light Railway.

== Final years ==
The line was comparatively unaffected by World War I, but experienced serious damage during the Irish Civil War of 1922–23. The destruction of a bridge over the River Lee seriously undermined the railway's viability; the railway was repaired and incorporated into the Great Southern Railways in 1925.

Road competition started to seriously affect the railway in the 1920s. The railway closed on 29 December 1934.

In one notable incident, a train collided with a steamroller on an adjacent road on 6 September 1927. Fault was disputed and it was mischievously suggested by some that the two were having a race. A fictionalised version appeared in the Rev. W. Awdry's Railway Series book no. 17, "Gallant Old Engine".

== Rolling stock ==
=== Locomotives ===
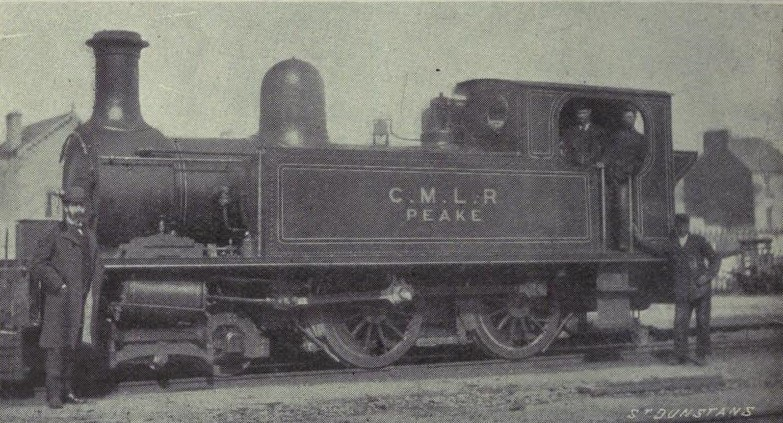
CMLR No. 8 Peake

The original three locomotives nos. 1–3 City of Cork, Coachford and St. Annes were originally supplied in a 2-4-0T configuration in 1887 by Falcon Engine & Car Works and were converted to 4-4-0T later. No. 4, the first to be call Blarney, was a small 4-2-0WT from Kitson and Company which was scrapped in 1911. Traffic needs dictated the ordering of two further locomotives, Nos. 5 and 6, 'Donoughmore and The Muskerry, 0-4-4T types from a Thomas Green & Company of Leeds & London. On closure of the CMLR these passed to the Schull and Skibbereen Railway and Tralee and Dingle Light Railway respectively. Two more 4-4-0T engines, Nos. 7 and 8, Peake and Dripsey were from Brush Electrical Engineering Company, Falcon's successor were ordered in the later 1890s and 1905 respectively and were broadly similar to earlier ones from the same manufacturer. The CMLR's final locomotive, No. 9, also named Blarney, a Hunslet Engine Company 4-4-0T, was ordered in 1911 but only delivered in 1919 due to the war, and then scrapped in 1927.

=== Carriages and wagons ===
The CMLR main fleet consisted of just over twenty bogie passengers vehicles of c. 30 feet (9 m) length seating of the order of 36 to 40 persons in a mixture of first and third classes.

== See also ==
- Cork, Blackrock and Passage Railway
- Cork City Railways
- List of narrow-gauge railways in Ireland
