= Schull =

Town in County Cork, Ireland

Skull Irish: Scoil Mhuire / an Scoil Schull
- Town
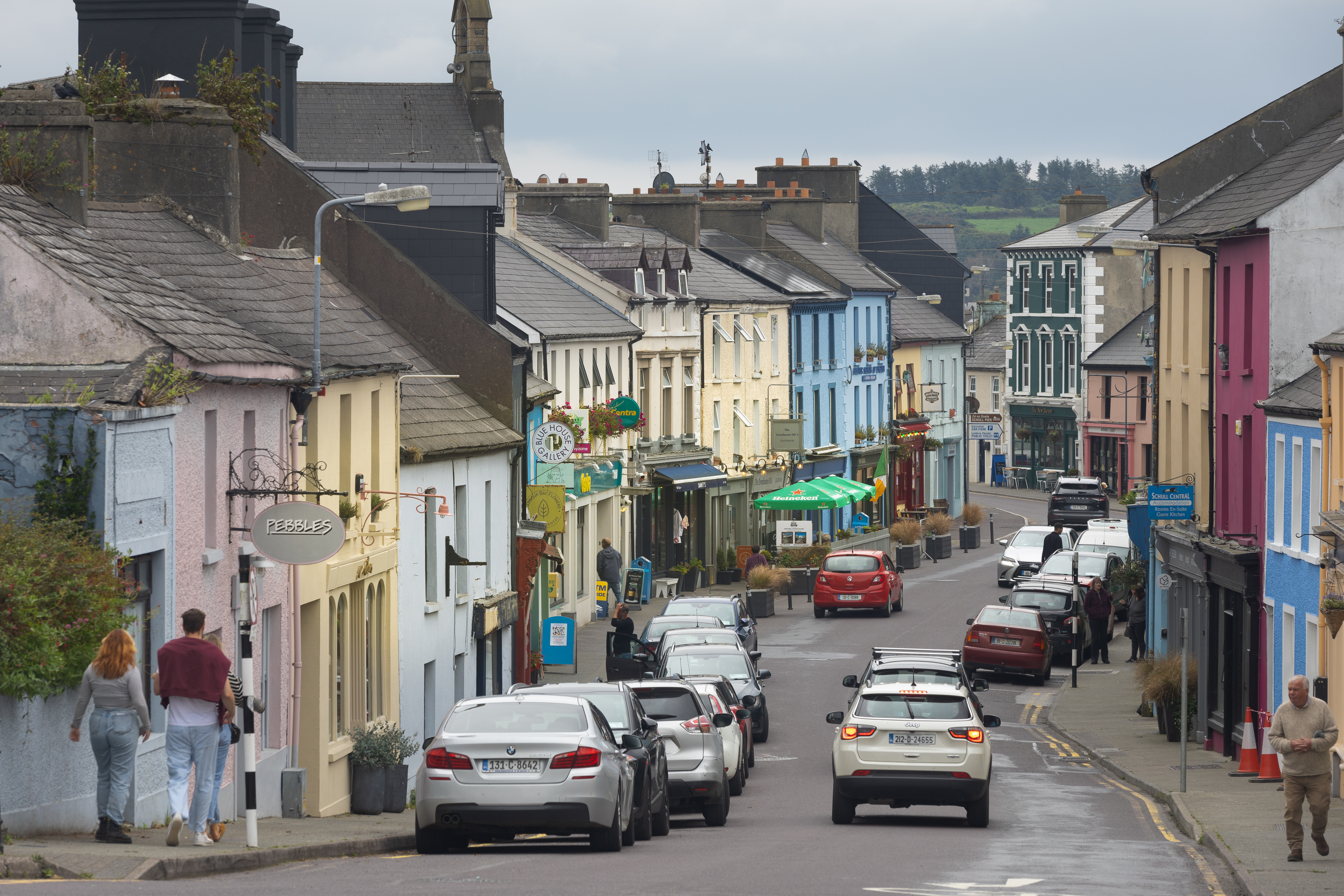
- Schull's main street

- Location in Ireland
- Coordinates: 51°31′36″N 9°32′53″W
- Country: Ireland
- Province: Munster
- County: County Cork

Population (2022)
  - Total: 669
- Time zone: UTC+0 (WET)
  - Summer (DST): UTC+1 (IST (WEST))
- Irish Grid Reference: V924317
- Website: www.schull.ie

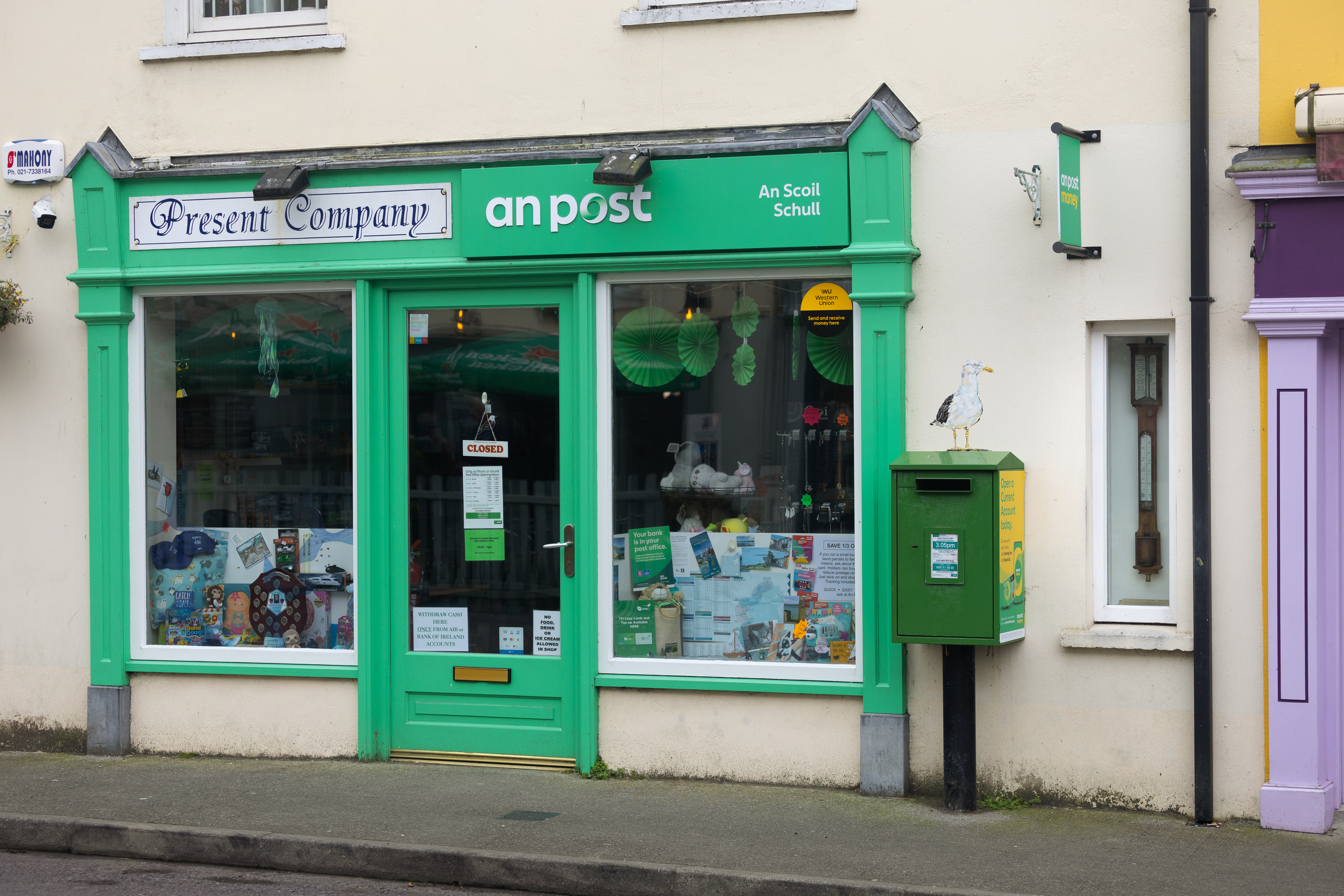
Historic barometer on display next to the post office

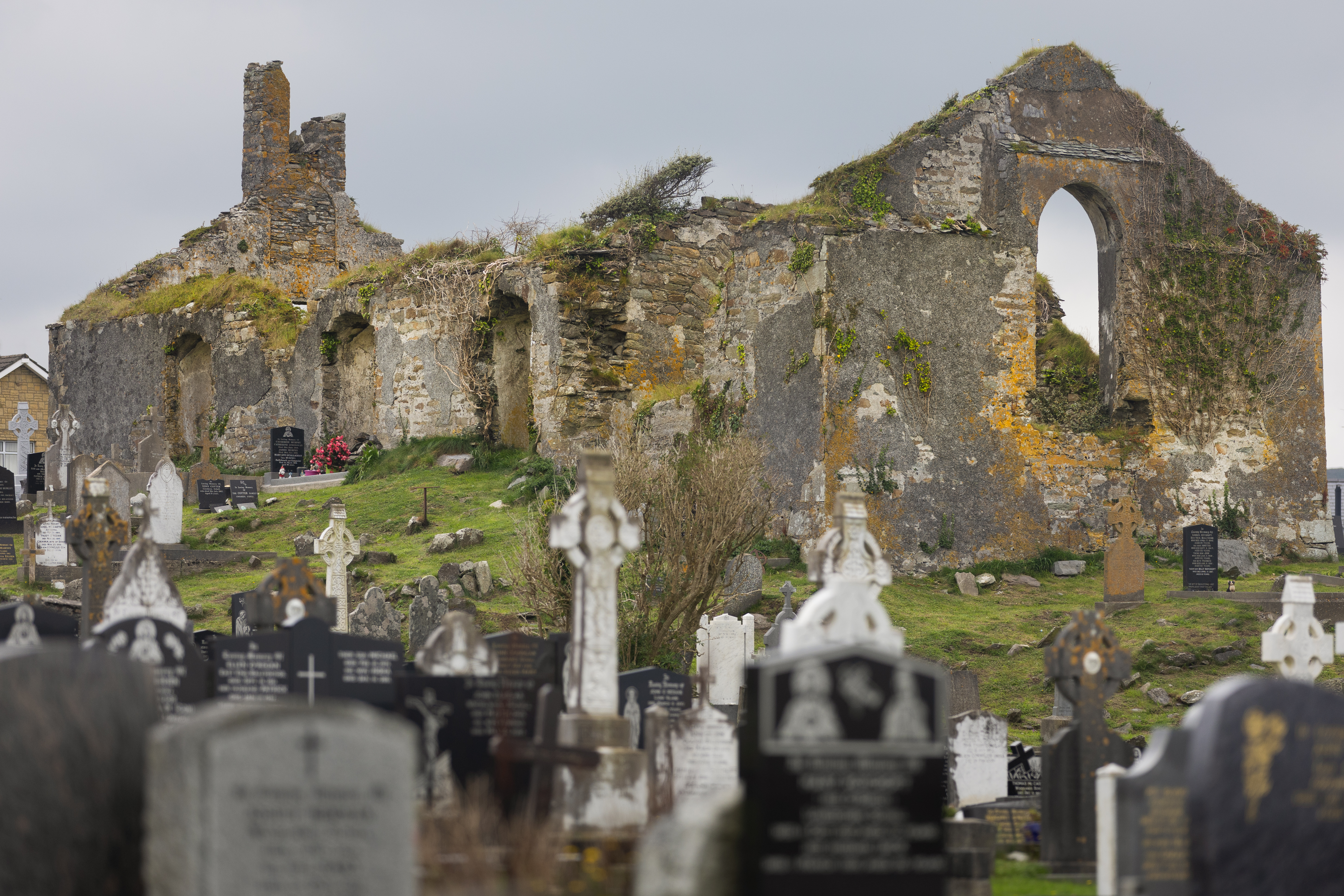
Ruins of the medieval parish church

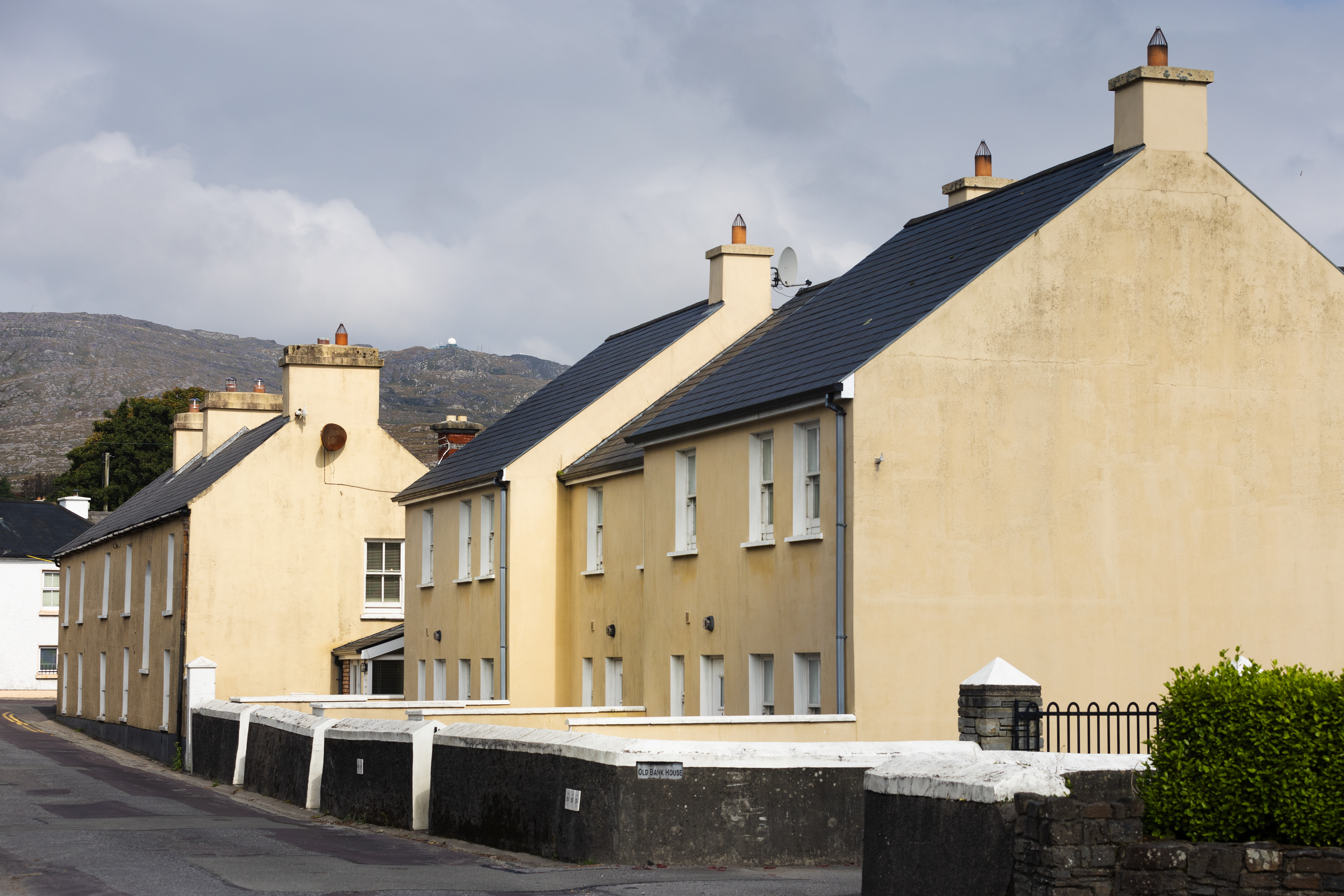
Mount Gabriel, which overlooks the town, as seen behind houses at the north end of the Colla Road

Schull or Skull (/ˈskʌl/ SKUL; Irish: An Scoil or Scoil Mhuire, meaning "Mary's School") is a town on the south-west coast of County Cork in Ireland.

Located on the southwest coast of Ireland in the municipal district of West Cork, the town is dominated by Mount Gabriel (407 m). It has a sheltered harbour, used for recreational boating. The area, on the peninsula leading to Mizen Head, is a tourist destination, and there are numerous holiday homes along the adjoining coast. Schull had a population of 669 in 2022. The town's secondary school, Schull Community College, houses one of the only planetariums in Ireland, along with a sailing school. Each year Schull harbour hosts the Fastnet International Schools Regatta.

== Name ==
The first recorded place name for this area is "scol", from a Decretal Letter of Pope Innocent III in 1199 to the bishop of Cork confirming the rights of the bishop of Cork. Both Skull and Skul are used in the Down Survey of 1656–58. Skull is also used in the Grand Jury Map surveyed in the 1790s and published 1811.

The Placenames (County Cork) Order of 2012 lists "An Scoil" as the Irish name for the village, in which "Scoil" is translated from "school". This is attributed by some to a school which was ostensibly located in the area.

However, others question this derivation, and Gary Dempsey's thesis ("Whispered in the Landscape/Written on the Street, A Study of Placename Policy and Conflict in Ireland from 1946 to 2010") suggests that the "Scoil Mhuire" form dates to 1893 when the parish priest of Schull at the time, Very Rev. John O'Connor (P.P. Schull 1888–1911), who "fancied himself as a historian, misread a Latin sentence as referring to a 'College of St. Mary' in Skull; in fact, the text referred to a collegiate church in Waterford but the PP had set the ball rolling".

== History ==
Evidence of ancient settlement in the area includes a number of ringfort, rock art and fulacht fiadh sites in the townlands of Skull, Caherlusky, Cooradarrigan and Gubbeen. The megalithic Altar Wedge Tomb lies to the west of the town. The tomb, which is estimated to have been built between 3000 and 2000 BC, was used as a Mass rock in the 18th century. Settlement in Schull itself dates to at least the 12th century.

In the early 17th century, the townland of Leamcon was a pirate stronghold, at a time when pirates traded in nearby Baltimore and Whiddy Island. Between the 17th and 18th centuries, the center of the town may have shifted somewhat, from the now ruined medieval church, towards the modern main road. The now ruined church that stands in the graveyard in Schull was first referenced, alongside the town, in a letter to the Bishop of Cork from Pope Innocent III in 1199. The medieval church itself was largely rebuilt in the 18th century, but later fell into ruin when the Holy Trinity church, closer to today's town centre, was built.

The workhouse, which still stands in Schull, was home to around 600 inmates during the Great Famine. During this period, in the mid-19th century, the graveyard near the workhouse doubled in size.

By the late 19th century, businesses in Schull (including banks, pubs and an inn) served the surrounding area. In 1889, a stick barometer was gifted to the people of Schull by representatives of the London Meteorological Office who gave a series of lectures on barometers to fishermen and sailors. The barometer is now on display next to the local An Post office.

== Demographics ==
As of the 2022 census, the town of Schull had a usual resident population of 627. Of these, 75.2% were White Irish, 0.5% were White Irish Travellers, 17.1% were Other White ethnicities, 0.5% were Black or Black Irish, 1.8% were Asian or Asian Irish, 1.9% were of other ethnicities, and 3.2% did not state their ethnicity. 75.4% of the usual residents were born in the Republic of Ireland, 12.6% in the United Kingdom, 5.9% in the rest of the world, 5.1% in other EU countries excluding Ireland and Poland, 0.6% in Poland and 0.3% in India.

== Transport ==
Schull once had its own railway station, which was the western terminus of the Schull and Skibbereen Railway, a steam-operated narrow gauge railway. Schull railway station opened on 6 September 1886, closed for passenger and goods traffic on 27 January 1947, and finally closed altogether on 1 June 1953.

The main bus route is Bus Éireann's number 237 to/from Cork City, though only some services reach Schull. Also, on occasional days there are buses to/from other towns/villages in the local area.

There is a ferry service between Schull and Cape Clear Island.

== Amenities ==
Schull's Garda station is located on the main road into the town (R592). Schull's fire station was inaugurated on 1 March 1984.

There is also a Coast Guard station, which was established in the 19th century, and has since been replaced by holiday homes called the Coast Guard Cottages. Schull's second Coast Guard station was renovated into a Garda station in the early 2000s. Since then, a new Coast Guard station has been built by the Garda station.

There is also a tourist office, medical centre and community hospital.

A planetarium, which is one of the only planetariums in Ireland, is located and operated from Schull Community College.

== In literature ==
The book Silver River (2007) by Daisy Goodwin includes a section on the efforts of her 3x great-grandfather, the Rector of Skull, to help the populace during the Great Famine.

== Events ==
The Schull Show, an agriculture show, takes place in late July in Schull Town Park. The Schull Regatta, which started in 1884, was "re-vamped" in 2014. Taking place over a weekend, usually in early August, markets stalls are typically set-up around Schull Harbour Pier. The weekend is centered around the rowing and sailing races, but also has food and shop stalls, carnival games, bouncy castles, music events and other activities.

== Notable people ==
- Fionn Ferreira, scientist and winner of the 2019 Google Science Fair, attended Schull Community College.
- Timothy O'Hea, recipient of the Victoria Cross was born in the area
- Ralph Allan Sampson, astronomer, born here
- John Sampson, linguist and Romani scholar, born here
- Sophie Toscan du Plantier, French television producer murdered at Dreenane, Toormore, near Schull, on the night of 23 December 1996
- Robert Traill (1793–1847), the local rector, who was notable for his efforts to alleviate suffering during the Great Irish Famine.
- Colin Vearncombe, English singer-songwriter, known professionally as Black, lived in Schull

== See also ==
- List of towns and villages in Ireland
