= Crooked Bridge railway station =

Railway station in Ireland

Crooked Bridge

General information
- Location: County Cork; Ireland

History
- Original company: West Carbery Light Railways and Tramways Company
- Pre-grouping: Schull and Skibbereen Railway
- Post-grouping: Great Southern Railways

Key dates
- 6 September 1886: Station opens
- 27 January 1947: Station closes

Crooked Bridge railway station was on the Schull and Skibbereen Railway in County Cork, Ireland.

== History ==
The station opened on 6 September 1886.

Regular passenger services were withdrawn on 27 January 1947.

== Routes ==
Preceding station	Disused railways	Following station
Kilcoe	Schull and Skibbereen Railway; Skibbereen=Schull	Ballydehob
