= Newcourt railway station =

Newcourt railway station may refer to:

- Newcourt railway station (England), a station in Exeter, Devon
- Newcourt railway station (Ireland), a disused station in County Cork
