= Fastnet =

Fastnet can refer to:

- Fastnet International Schools Regatta, a regatta held in County Cork, Ireland
- Fastnet Line, a passenger ferry service operating between Wales and Ireland
- Fastnet (netball), a variation of the rules of netball used primarily in the World Netball Series
- Fastnet Race, one of the four or so most prestigious ocean races in competitive sailing
- Fastnet Rock, a small clay-slate island with quartz veins and the most southerly point of Ireland
  - Fastnet Lighthouse, on Fastnet Rock
- A sea area, named for the rock, used in the British Shipping Forecast
- Fastnet Rock (horse), an Australian thoroughbred racehorse stallion
- FastNet, the business name of South African communication service provider Swiftnet Pty Ltd, a subsidiary of Telkom
