= Ballydehob railway station =

Station in County Cork, Ireland

Ballydehob

General information
- Location: Ballydehob, County Cork; Ireland
- Coordinates: 51.5617°N 9.4547°W
- Platforms: Island

History
- Opened: 6 September 1886
- Closed: 27 January 1947
- Original company: West Carbery Light Railways and Tramways Company
- Pre-grouping: Schull and Skibbereen Railway
- Post-grouping: Great Southern Railways

Services
Preceding station	Schull and Skibbereen Railway	Following station
Crooked Bridge	Skibbereen=Schull	Woodlands
Location

Ballydehob railway station was on the Schull and Skibbereen Railway in County Cork, Ireland.

== History ==
The station opened on 6 September 1886.

Regular passenger services were withdrawn on 27 January 1947.
