= SSLR 4 =

Class of 1 Irish 4-4-0T locomotive

Schull & Skibbereen Light Railway 4
Type and origin
- Power type: Steam
- Builder: Nasmyth, Wilson & Co.
- Serial number: 341 or 342
- Build date: 1888
Specifications
- Configuration
  - Whyte: 4-4-0T
  - UIC: 2′B n2t
- Gauge: 3 ft (914 mm)
- Leading dia.: 1 ft 10 in (0.559 m)
- Driver dia.: 3 ft 4 in (1.016 m)
- Axle load: 9 long tons 11 cwt (21,400 lb or 9.7 t); 9 long tons 11 cwt (9.7 t; 10.7 short tons)
- Adhesive weight: 18 long tons 10 cwt (41,400 lb or 18.8 t); 18 long tons 10 cwt (18.8 t; 20.7 short tons)
- Loco weight: 24 long tons 6 cwt (54,400 lb or 24.7 t); 24 long tons 6 cwt (24.7 t; 27.2 short tons)
- Fuel type: Coal
- Fuel capacity: 0 long tons 10 cwt (1,100 lb or 0.5 t); 0 long tons 10 cwt (0.51 t; 0.56 short tons)
- Water cap.: 500 or 600 imp gal (2,300 or 2,700 L; 600 or 720 US gal)
- Firebox
  - Grate area: 9 sq ft (0.84 m^{2})
- Boiler pressure: 150 lbf/in^{2} (1.03 MPa)
- Heating surface
  - Firebox: 56 sq ft (5.2 m^{2})
  - Tubes: 453 sq ft (42.1 m^{2})
- Cylinders: Two
- Cylinder size: 12 in × 18 in (305 mm × 457 mm)
Performance figures
- Tractive effort: 8,260 lbf (36.74 kN)
Career
- Operators: SSLR » Great Southern Railways » CIÉ
- Class: GSR/CIÉ: 4S or DN5
- Number in class: 1
- Numbers: 4
- Official name: Erin
- Withdrawn: 1954

Schull and Skibbereen Railway 4 Erin was a 4-4-0T locomotive manufactured by Nasmyth, Wilson and Company of Patricroft near Manchester in 1888. It was the Schull and Skibbereen Railway's fourth locomotive.

In 1925, the railway was absorbed into the Great Southern Railways and renumbered 4S, and placed in Class 4S or Class DN5 as the sole member. Following the GSR classification by wheel arrangement, "D" meaning a locomotive with a 4-4-0 arrangement, "N" meaning Narrow Gauge. The 4-4-0 wheel arrangement is unusual for tank locomotives but more common on narrow gauge than standard.

The locomotive was withdrawn and scrapped in 1954.
