= Catherine Flemming =

German film and TV actress

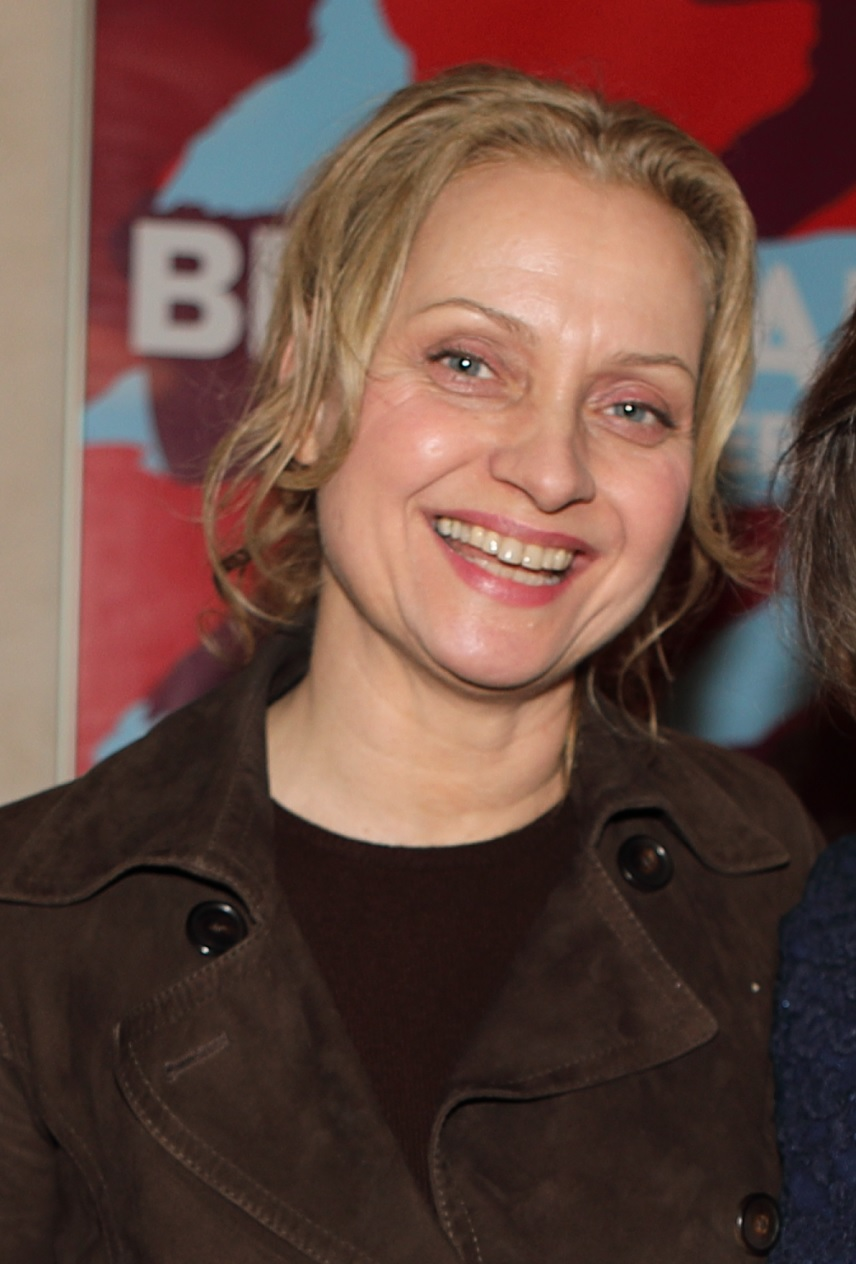
Flemming in 2018

Catherine Flemming (born 2 February 1967 in Karl-Marx-Stadt, East Germany) (now Chemnitz, Saxony, Germany) is a German film and TV actress. She has performed in more than eighty films and TV roles since 1995, nearly all in German.

She is best known in English for her role in the 2016 British TV series Victoria, where she portrays the Duchess of Kent, the mother of Queen Victoria.

== Partial filmography ==
Year	Title	Role	Notes
2000	No Place to Go	Isabelle	
2003	Angst		
2011	Wunderkinder	Helga Reich	

== Television appearances ==
Year	Title	Role	Notes
2007	Der Kriminalist	Uta Ebert	episode: Außer Kontrolle
2016	Victoria	The Duchess of Kent	
