= SSLR 1 and 3 =

Schull and Skibbereen Light Railway locomotives 1 and 3 GSR Class 1S / Class DN4
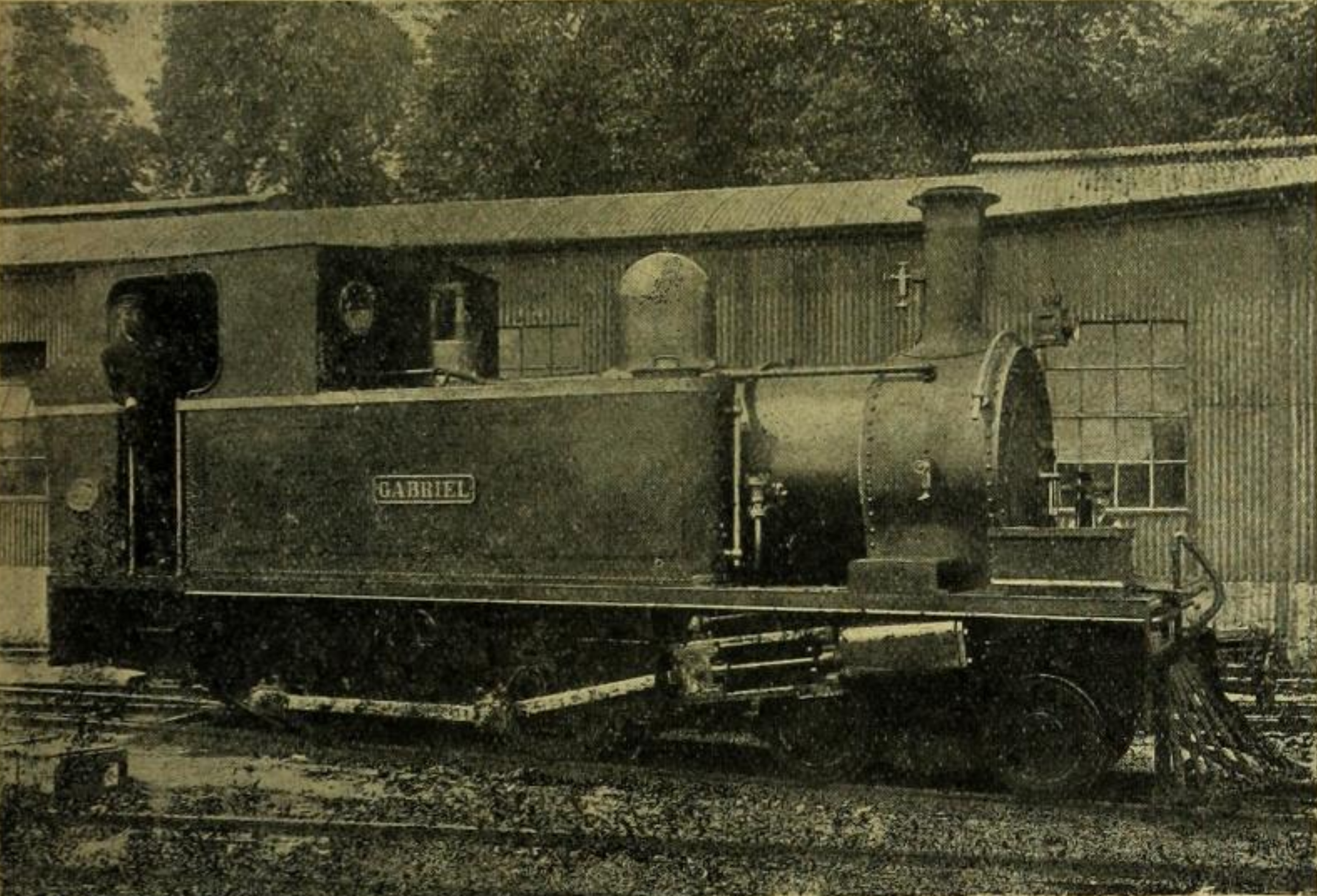
- 4-4-0T No. 1 Gabriel
Type and origin
- Power type: Steam
- Builder: Peckett and Sons
- Serial number: 1085, 1356
- Build date: 1905, 1914
- Total produced: 2
Specifications
- Configuration
  - Whyte: 4-4-0T
  - UIC: 2′B n2t
- Gauge: 3 ft (914 mm)
- Leading dia.: 2 ft 0 in (0.610 m)
- Driver dia.: 3 ft 0 1/2 in (0.927 m)
- Length: No. 1: 26 ft 2 1/2 in (7.99 m), No. 3: 24 ft 11 in (7.59 m)
- Axle load: No. 1: 10 long tons 15 cwt (24,100 lb or 10.9 t), No. 3: 10 long tons 5 cwt (23,000 lb or 10.4 t)
- Adhesive weight: No. 1: 20 long tons 15 cwt (46,500 lb or 21.1 t), No. 3: 20 long tons 0 cwt (44,800 lb or 20.3 t)
- Loco weight: No. 1: 26 long tons 10 cwt (59,400 lb or 26.9 t), No. 3: 25 long tons 10 cwt (57,100 lb or 25.9 t)
- Fuel type: Coal
- Fuel capacity: No. 1: 1 long ton 5 cwt (2,800 lb or 1.3 t), No. 3: 0 long tons 18 cwt (2,000 lb or 0.9 t)
- Water cap.: 600 imperial gallons (2,700 L; 720 US gal)
- Firebox
  - Grate area: No. 1: 8 sq ft (0.74 m^{2}), No. 3: 7.6 sq ft (0.71 m^{2})
- Boiler pressure: 160 psi (1.10 MPa)
- Heating surface
  - Firebox: No. 1: 83 sq ft (7.7 m^{2}), No. 3: 60 sq ft (5.6 m^{2})
  - Tubes: No. 1: 492 sq ft (45.7 m^{2}), No. 3: 454 sq ft (42.2 m^{2})
- Cylinders: Two
- Cylinder size: 12 in × 18 in (305 mm × 457 mm)
Performance figures
- Tractive effort: 9,650 lbf (42.93 kN)
Career
- Operators: SSLR » GSR » CIÉ
- Class: GSR/CIÉ: DN4
- Numbers: SSLR: 1, 3; GSR: 1S, 3S
- Withdrawn: 1936, 1953
- Disposition: Both scrapped

Schull and Skibbereen Light Railway 1 and 3 were two 4-4-0T locomotives manufactured by Peckett and Sons in 1906 and 1914 respectively. They were the Schull and Skibbereen Railway's fifth and sixth locomotives, and took the numbers of withdrawn locomotives.

== History ==
The first member of this class was numbered "No. 1" and named "Gabriel", replacing the original No. 1, named "Marion", which was scrapped on its arrival.

The second locomotive was also built by Peckett and Sons and delivered to the railway in 1914. It was numbered "No. 3" and originally named "Consiliation" but later renamed "Kent". This replaced the original No. 3 "Ilen", which was scrapped when the new locomotive arrived.

Both locomotives passed to the Great Southern Railways in the 1925 amalgamation. The GSR added an "S" suffix to the running number and classified both locomotives as Class 1S (or Class DN4). No. 1S was withdrawn and scrapped in 1936, but No. 3S survived until nationalisation when it passed to Córas Iompair Éireann. Eventually, it was withdrawn and scrapped in 1953.

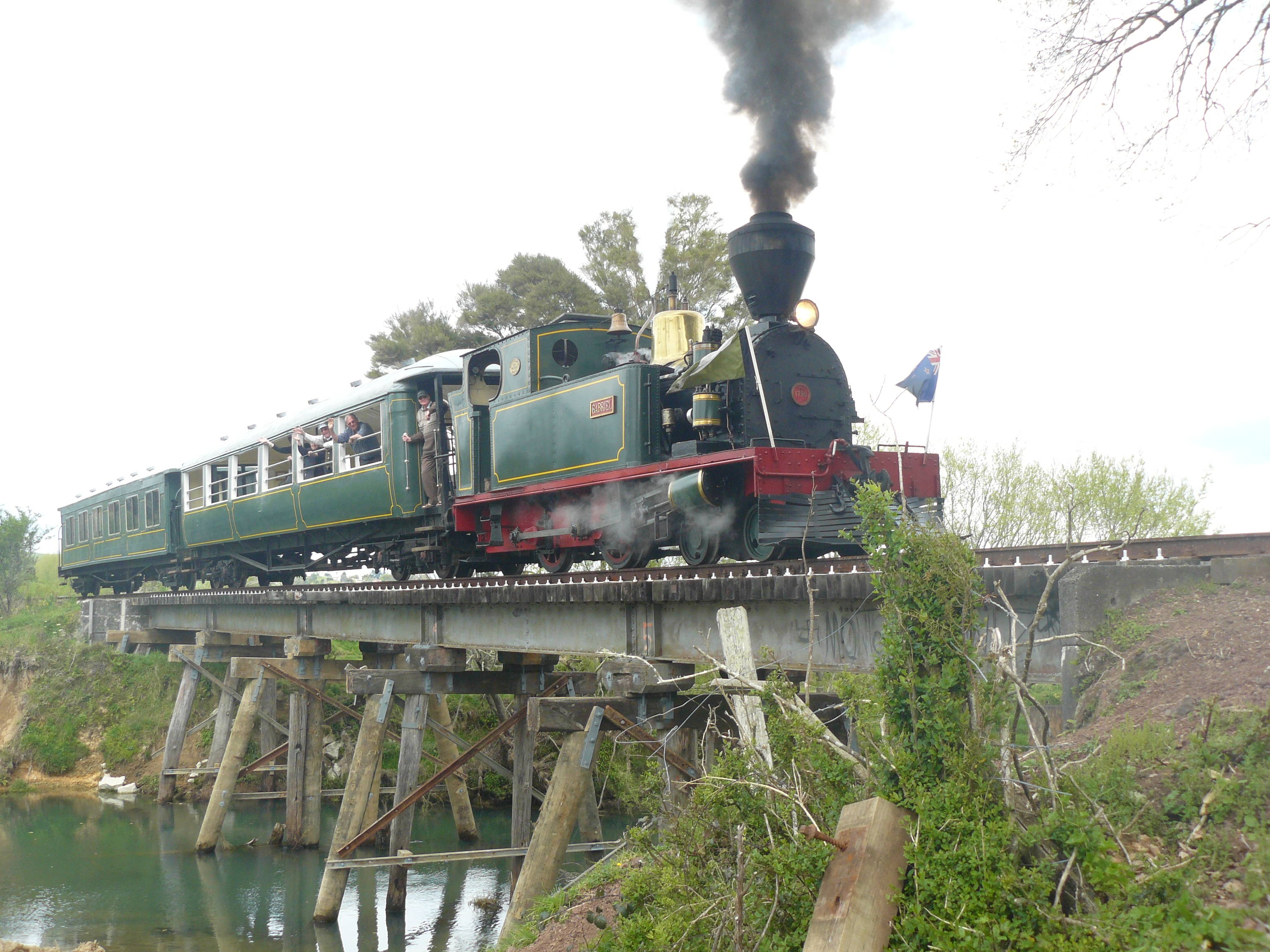
Sister locomotive Peckett 1730, on New Zealand's Bay of Islands Vintage Railway

=== Preservation ===
The S&S pair were two of a class of five engines, two others went to Borneo and scrapped c. 1947, whilst the last is currently preserved on the Bay of Islands Vintage Railway in New Zealand.
