= Victoria (British TV series) =

British drama television series

- Genre: Historical drama
- Created by: Daisy Goodwin
- Written by: Daisy Goodwin; Guy Andrews; Ottilie Wilford
- Starring: Jenna Coleman; Tom Hughes; Peter Bowles; Catherine Flemming; Daniela Holtz; Nell Hudson; Ferdinand Kingsley; Tommy Knight; Nigel Lindsay; Eve Myles; David Oakes; Paul Rhys; Adrian Schiller; Peter Firth; Alex Jennings; Rufus Sewell; Bebe Cave; Margaret Clunie; Tilly Steele; Leo Suter; Jordan Waller; Anna Wilson-Jones; Diana Rigg; Nicholas Audsley; Sabrina Bartlett; David Burnett; Kate Fleetwood; Vincent Regan; Lily Travers; John Sessions; Laurence Fox
- Theme music composer: Martin Phipps
- Composer: Ruth Barrett
- Country of origin: United Kingdom
- Original language: English
- No. of series: 3
- No. of episodes: 25

Production
- Executive producers: Daisy Goodwin; Dan McCulloch; Damien Timmer; Rebecca Eaton
- Producers: Paul Frift; David Boulter
- Production location: United Kingdom
- Running time: 46–89 minutes
- Production companies: Mammoth Screen; Masterpiece

Original release
- Network: ITV
- Release: 28 August 2016 – 12 May 2019

Victoria is a British historical television drama series created and principally written by Daisy Goodwin, starring Jenna Coleman as Queen Victoria. The series premiered in the United Kingdom on ITV on 28 August 2016 with eight episodes, and in the United States on PBS on 15 January 2017; PBS supported its production as part of the Masterpiece anthology. The series follows Victoria's early life, including her relationship with her husband Albert and her political responsibilities of the 1830s to the 1850s.

A second series was broadcast on ITV in 2017, including a Christmas special that aired that December; PBS broadcast followed starting in January 2018, with the special belatedly airing in March. In December 2017, Victoria was renewed for an eight-episode third series, which premiered on PBS on 13 January 2019, and on ITV on 24 March 2019 before concluding on 12 May 2019. In July 2021, ITV stated "there are no plans presently to film Victoria, but that's not to say we won't revisit the series with the production team at a later date".

== Premise ==
The first series (covering 1837–1840) depicts the first few years of the reign of Queen Victoria (portrayed by Jenna Coleman), from her accession to the British throne at the age of 18 (1837), to her intense friendship and infatuation with her favourite advisor Lord Melbourne (Rufus Sewell), to her courtship and early marriage (1840) to Prince Albert (Tom Hughes) of Germany, and finally to the birth of their firstborn child and eldest daughter, Victoria, Princess Royal (born 1840).

The second series (covering 1840–1849) follows Queen Victoria's struggles to balance her queenly role as the youngest monarch with her duties to her husband and children, various dramas within the English and German branches of the royal family, international relations with France, and such crises as the Anglo-Afghan War (1838–1842) and the 1840s Famine in Ireland (1845–1849).

At the beginning of the third series (covering 1849–1851), Victoria and Albert have six children and have just entered their early 30s while navigating difficulties in their marriage; as the series progresses, these tensions ebb and flow. Subplots in the third series include Albert's ongoing efforts to find his place, culminating in The Great Exhibition (1851), and his efforts to mould his eldest son (ages 7–9) into a king; Victoria's political relationship with the charismatic Lord Palmerston; the sudden arrival of Queen Victoria's estranged maternal half-sister, Princess Feodora, at the palace; and a forbidden romance between one of the Queen's ladies and a footman. The onset of Albert's health issues are also referenced, leading to the series ending in a cliffhanger.

== Cast ==
=== Main ===
- Jenna Coleman as Queen Victoria of the United Kingdom of Great Britain and Ireland
- Tom Hughes as Prince Albert of Saxe-Coburg and Gotha
- Peter Bowles as Arthur Wellesley, 1st Duke of Wellington: Prime Minister of the United Kingdom
- Catherine Flemming as Princess Victoria, Duchess of Kent and Strathearn (series 1–2)
- Daniela Holtz as Louise, Baroness Lehzen, Victoria's governess (series 1–2)
- Nell Hudson as Nancy Skerrett, Principal Dresser to the Queen
- Ferdinand Kingsley as Mr Francatelli, Royal Chef to the Queen
- Tommy Knight as Archibald Brodie, Bell Boy to the Queen
- Nigel Lindsay as Sir Robert Peel, 2nd Baronet: Prime Minister of the United Kingdom (series 1–2)
- Eve Myles as Mrs Jenkins, Senior Dresser to the Queen (series 1)
- David Oakes as Prince Ernest of Saxe-Coburg and Gotha, Albert's brother who is the Queen's first cousin (series 1–2)
- Paul Rhys as Sir John Conroy, the Duchess of Kent's comptroller (series 1)
- Adrian Schiller as Mr Cornelius Penge, footman at Kensington Palace; later footman at Buckingham Palace
- Peter Firth as King Ernest Augustus of Hanover, Victoria's paternal uncle (series 1–2)
- Alex Jennings as King Leopold I of the Belgians, who is Victoria's and Albert's uncle, the Duchess of Kent's younger brother (and widower of Princess Charlotte of Wales)
- Rufus Sewell as Lord Melbourne, Prime Minister of the United Kingdom (series 1–2)
- Bebe Cave as Lady Wilhelmina Paget (née Coke), Lord Alfred's wife (series 2)
- Margaret Clunie as Harriet, Duchess of Sutherland, the Queen's lady-in-waiting (recurring series 1, main series 2)
- Tilly Steele as Miss Cleary, Junior Dresser to the Queen (series 2)
- Leo Suter as Mr Drummond, Sir Robert Peel's private secretary (series 2)
- Jordan Waller as Lord Alfred Paget, Clerk Marshal to the Queen (recurring series 1, main series 2–3)
- Anna Wilson-Jones as Lady Emma Portman, Lady of the Bedchamber to the Queen (recurring series 1, main series 2–3)
- Diana Rigg as Matilda, Duchess of Buccleuch, the Queen's lady-in-waiting (series 2)
- Nicholas Audsley as Charles, Duke of Monmouth, the Duchess of Monmouth's husband (series 3)
- Sabrina Bartlett as Abigail Turner, Lady's maid to the Queen (series 3)
- David Burnett as Joseph Weld, Footman at Buckingham Palace (series 3)
- Kate Fleetwood as Princess Feodora, Victoria's half-sister (series 3)
- Bruno Wolkowitch (featured series 2) and Vincent Regan (main series 3) as King Louis Philippe I of the French
- Lily Travers as Sophie, Duchess of Monmouth, the Queen's lady-in-waiting (series 3)
- John Sessions as Lord John Russell, Prime Minister of the United Kingdom (series 3)
- Laurence Fox as Lord Palmerston, Foreign Secretary (series 3)

=== Recurring ===
- Peter Ivatts as William Howley, the Archbishop of Canterbury
- Tom Price as The Duke of Sutherland, the Duchess of Sutherland's husband (series 1–2)
- Robin Soans as Sir James Clark, Physician to the Queen (series 1–2)
- Samantha Colley as Eliza Skerrett, Nancy Skerrett's first cousin (series 1–2)
- Andrew Bicknell as The Duke of Saxe-Coburg and Gotha, Ernest's and Albert's father who is Victoria's maternal uncle (and the Duchess of Kent's and the King of the Belgians's older brother) (series 1–2)
- Hallie Woodhall (series 2) and Louisa Bay (series 3) as Victoria, Princess Royal "Vicky", Victoria's and Albert's eldest daughter
- Mac Jackson (series 2) and Laurie Shepherd (series 3) as Albert Edward, Prince of Wales "Bertie", Victoria's and Albert's eldest son
- John Tueart as Lord Eversley, Speaker of the House (series 2–3)

==== Series 1 ====
- Robin McCallum as Lord Portman, Lord Lieutenant of Somerset
- Nichola McAuliffe as Queen Frederica of Hanover, Victoria's paternal aunt by marriage
- Richard Dixon as Lord Cottenham, Lord Chancellor
- Alice Orr-Ewing as Lady Flora Hastings, the Duchess of Kent's lady-in-waiting
- Julian Finnigan as Lord Hastings, Lady Flora Hastings's brother
- Daniel Donskoy as Alexander, Tsesarevich of Russia
- Guy Oliver-Watts as Sir George Hayter, Principal Painter in Ordinary to the Queen
- Nicholas Agnew as Prince George of Cambridge, Victoria's first cousin who is the son of Victoria's paternal uncle, Prince Adolphus, Duke of Cambridge
- Basil Eidenbenz as Lohlein, Prince Albert's valet
- David Bamber as The Duke of Sussex, Victoria's paternal uncle
- Daisy Goodwin as The Duchess of Inverness, Victoria's paternal aunt by marriage
- Simon Paisley Day as The Earl of Uxbridge, Lord Chamberlain
- Robert MacPherson as Anson, Private Secretary to Prince Albert

==== Series 2 ====
- Phil Rowson as John Bright MP, Member of Parliament for the City of Durham
- Tommy Rodger as Boy Jones, a boy who entered Buckingham Palace during 1838 to 1841
- Andrew Havill as Dr Pritchard
- Zaris-Angel Hator as Sarah Forbes, Captain Forbes's adopted daughter who is the Queen's goddaughter
- Ben Lamb as Captain Forbes, Sarah's adopted father
- Catherine Steadman as Mrs Forbes, Sarah's adopted mother
- Martin Compston as Dr Traill, Irish campaigner for Famine victims in Cork
- Denis Lawson as The Duke of Atholl, the Queen's guard in a royal visit at Blair Castle

==== Series 3 ====
- Siobhan O'Carroll as Lady Lyttelton, the Prince of Wales's governess
- C.J. Beckford as William Cuffay, the Chartist Leader
- Ben Cartwright as Feargus O'Connor, Irish Chartist Leader
- Kerr Logan as Patrick Fitzgerald, the Irish Chartist
- Gregory Mann as William Monmouth, the Duke and Duchess of Monmouth's son
- Laura Morgan as Florence Nightingale, Trainer of Nurses during the Crimean War
- Hilton McRae as George Combe, Scottish Lawyer who wrote The Constitution of Man
- Hugh Simon as Colonel Sibthorp, Member of Parliament for Lincoln
- Bernard Melling as Guard
- Pandora Clifford as Emily Palmerston, Lord Palmerston's wife
- David Newman as Henry Cole, Great Exhibition's organiser
- Tristram Wymark as Lord Taunton, Secretary of State for the Colonies
- Christopher Brand as Joseph Paxton, The Crystal Palace's designer
- Ellen Evans as Princess Adelheid "Heidi", Victoria's half-niece
- Sam Swainsbury as Dr John Snow, the Physician who traced the source of a cholera outbreak in London in 1854
- Edwin Thomas as Mr Caine, the Prince of Wales's tutor

== Episodes ==
Series	Episodes	Originally released (UK)	
Series	Episodes	First released	Last released
1	8	28 August 2016	9 October 2016
2	8	27 August 2017	15 October 2017
2	Special	25 December 2017	
3 (Note: The third series was broadcast on PBS in the United States ahead of its original release on ITV in the United Kingdom. See the episode table and broadcast section for the dates.)	8	24 March 2019	12 May 2019

=== Series 1 (2016) ===
No. overall	No. in series	Title	Directed by	Written by	Original release date	UK viewers (millions)
1	1	"Doll 123"	Tom Vaughan	Daisy Goodwin	28 August 2016	8.00
Eighteen-year-old Alexandrina Victoria ascends to the throne after the death of her paternal uncle, King William IV. She asserts her independence by resisting the suffocating influence of her mother, the Duchess of Kent and the abusive, domineering Sir John Conroy, the duchess's comptroller, who reared Victoria under the repressive Kensington System. Victoria, believing her mother is having an affair with Conroy, creates a scandal by spreading a rumour that the Duchess's lady-in-waiting, Lady Flora Hastings, is pregnant with Sir John's child. Lady Flora is forced to undergo a medical examination, which reveals she is a virgin, but with a growing abdominal tumour that will prove fatal. The public is outraged that Lady Flora's reputation was damaged. Victoria feels her reign is tarnished, but the prime minister, Lord Melbourne, encourages the queen to stand tall and face the public.
2	2	"Ladies in Waiting"	Tom Vaughan	Daisy Goodwin	29 August 2016	7.37
The Whig Prime Minister Lord Melbourne announces he must resign, saying he lacks support in parliament. Victoria asks the Duke of Wellington to form a new government but he declines, saying he is too old. He suggests she instead invite Tory leader Sir Robert Peel, which she does reluctantly. However, Peel agrees only on the condition that she dismiss some of her Ladies of the Bedchamber, as four are married to Whig ministers, and replace them with the wives of Tories, as is customary. The Queen refuses, as she considers them her intimate friends and not political pawns. This leads to the Bedchamber crisis. Melbourne insists he cannot undermine the British constitution by governing at the monarch's whim, but he eventually gives in and stays on as Prime Minister. Sir John, Victoria's mother, and her paternal uncle the Duke of Cumberland, scheme to install a regency to limit Victoria's power by making people believe she has inherited the madness of her grandfather, King George III. This plan backfires; her uncle is forced to abandon his hope to be King by proxy and Victoria's resentment of Conroy deepens.
3	3	"Brocket Hall"	Tom Vaughan	Daisy Goodwin	4 September 2016	7.75
Sir John and the Duchess want Victoria to marry, believing she needs a man to control her independent nature. Victoria's maternal uncle, King Leopold of the Belgians, arrives to pressure her to marry his nephew and her cousin Prince Albert of Saxe-Coburg and Gotha. Although she thinks him handsome, Victoria is uninterested in the serious and reserved Albert. Leopold attempts to persuade Lord Melbourne to support the scheme; Melbourne resists pushing the queen into a marriage with the wrong person. Victoria, believing she is in love with Melbourne, pursues him, but he gently rebuffs her. Disgusted with Sir John's scheming, Victoria offers him a baronetcy and pension to leave court, devastating her mother, who is overly dependent on and has long overlooked his embezzlement. Following the Newport Rising, Victoria takes pity on the leaders and commutes their death sentences to exile in Australia.
4	4	"The Clockwork Prince"	Sandra Goldbacher	Daisy Goodwin	11 September 2016	7.62
Albert visits Victoria. They are mutually aloof and resentful for being pushed upon each other. Some at court feel Albert, as a younger son and prince of a minor duchy, is inferior to the queen. As they spend time together, an attraction slowly grows. Albert, however, challenges Victoria about Lord Melbourne's influence over her and his sheltering her from reality. Following an argument, Albert prepares to leave, believing he has lost her favour. Victoria has come to terms with her love for Albert, but hesitates to propose, as she is not sure if Albert will accept. After confiding her worries to Leopold and being given encouragement, Victoria proposes, and Albert eagerly accepts.
5	5	"An Ordinary Woman"	Sandra Goldbacher	Daisy Goodwin	18 September 2016	7.65
When Victoria announces her engagement, the Tory parliament reacts with hostility to a German consort, especially one being given a British title and large annual allowance. Additionally, the Duke of Wellington notes that Albert is not a Catholic, which would preclude Victoria from marrying him without abdicating her crown. Though unable to bestow a royal title such as Duke or King, Victoria makes Albert a Knight of the Garter and gives him a small allowance. Albert is offended, feeling he will be without position or independence, while Victoria worries that a larger allowance would enable him to keep a mistress like her Uncle Leopold did. They reassure each other and, on 10 February 1840, they are married.
6	6	"The Queen's Husband"	Olly Blackburn	Daisy Goodwin	25 September 2016	7.65
Victoria and Albert are happily married. However, Victoria fears dying in childbirth like her cousin Princess Charlotte, whose death led to Victoria inheriting the crown. Her lady's maid gives her useless advice to avoid pregnancy. Victoria curries favour with her paternal uncle, the Duke of Sussex, who is unable to present his wife at court because their morganatic marriage violates the Royal Marriages Act 1772. Although his wife is the daughter of an earl, she is not of royal birth. Victoria uses her discretion to make her the Duchess of Inverness and welcomes her to court. An abolitionist group asks Victoria to open its London meeting, held in June 1840. She says she will publicly support the cause, but is unable to open it because of her position. Albert instead volunteers to give an address against slavery, a subject he feels strongly about. His speech is considered a great success.
7	7	"The Engine of Change"	Olly Blackburn	Guy Andrews	2 October 2016	7.31
Victoria, pregnant with her first child, is desperately afraid of dying in childbirth. Her mother insists she refrain from affairs of state and rest full-time. The ministers ask Victoria to choose a regent in the case she dies but her baby survives. She insists on Albert as regent, which enrages the Tories. However, Sir Robert Peel believes Albert could be manipulated, and supports him as regent. Albert takes an interest in railway building, but Victoria discourages. Sir Robert takes Albert to ride on his locomotive, which infuriates her. Albert, however, insists that he have some influence in his new country, while she worries that this could undermine her authority as queen. Nevertheless Victoria takes a ride on a locomotive herself, which she finds exhilarating.
8	8	"Young England"	Olly Blackburn	Daisy Goodwin	9 October 2016	7.74
The pregnant Victoria insists on her daily carriage rides to greet her subjects. However, as her due date draws near, worry over history repeating itself increases. The Duke of Cumberland, now the King of Hanover, insists that the British people would not accept Albert as regent should Victoria die. Cumberland hints of assassination threats. On 10 June 1840, Edward Oxford attempts to shoot Victoria during a carriage ride. Cumberland, who is first in line to the throne, is blamed but denies any involvement. Oxford's guns were unloaded at the time. He is declared not guilty by reason of insanity and sent to a lunatic asylum. On 21 November 1840, Victoria goes into labour. Much to everyone's relief, she delivers a healthy baby girl, also named Victoria without any complications.

=== Series 2 (2017) ===
No. overall	No. in series	Title	Directed by	Written by	Original release date	UK viewers (millions)
9	1	"A Soldier's Daughter"	Lisa James Larsson	Daisy Goodwin	27 August 2017	6.17
A month after giving birth to her daughter, Victoria finds that the government has not been confiding in her, and becomes irritated with Albert for helping them. After being confined to her rooms to recover from childbirth, Victoria learns that British troops were slain in the Anglo-Afghan War, and she refuses Leopold's attempt to arrange a political marriage for the princess. With the public angry about the military defeats, Victoria makes her first post-childbirth public appearance at the launch of HMS Trafalgar, while Albert seeks advice from his brother Ernest on how to repair his relationship with Victoria. Miss Skerrett is promoted following the departure of Mrs Jenkins, while Mr Francatelli, the Queen's previous chef, is persuaded to return. The Duchess of Buccleuch is appointed as the Queen's new Mistress of the Robes following the Duchess of Sutherland's resignation.
10	2	"The Green-Eyed Monster"	Lisa James Larsson	Daisy Goodwin	3 September 2017	6.62
Albert resists his profligate father's demands and, as a result, he visits the Royal Society to meet the pioneers of the computing industry, Charles Babbage and Ada Lovelace. He invites them to a palace function. Victoria becomes jealous of Albert's admiration of Lovelace, the daughter of Lord Byron, a man known for his many affairs. Victoria wonders if Albert intends to make her his mistress. She seeks assurance from Lord Melbourne that the relationship is not romantic; he reassures her. Victoria becomes pregnant again, causing initial distress following so soon after the first birth, but it eventually gives Albert and her a reason to reconcile. In the kitchens, a young thief makes his way through the castle, convincing Miss Cleary, the Queen's assistant dresser, that it is haunted and a ghost roams the halls.
11	3	"Warp and Weft"	Geoffrey Sax	Daisy Goodwin	10 September 2017	6.56
After the presence of the thief becomes known, Albert becomes apprehensive about the presence of the boy and inefficiency of the household staff. The wages of the staff are increased as an incentive to make them more attentive. Victoria meets a silk weaver from Spitalfields, who explains how local weavers have been hurt by imported foreign silk. To support them, Victoria decides to hold a ball with all the costumes made from Spitalfields material. Sir Robert Peel advises against it, and on the night of the ball, villagers gather outside the palace to protest at the extravagance while people are starving. An ailing Lord Melbourne also attends and attempts to hide his condition from Victoria. After Melbourne reveals his condition to Albert, Victoria visits Melbourne for an emotional goodbye. She returns to the palace and discovers her beloved dog, Dash, has died; she buries him in the Palace grounds.
12	4	"The Sins of the Father"	Geoffrey Sax	Ottilie Wilford	17 September 2017	6.77
Victoria gives birth to a son and suffers postnatal depression. When Albert travels to Germany to attend his father's funeral, he learns that Leopold believes that he might be Albert's biological father. Albert's mother had found comfort with Leopold while her husband pursued other women. Albert, questioning his beliefs and his sense of identity, drinks excessively, then leaves for England the next day without a farewell. Victoria, encouraged by the Duchess of Buccleuch, continues making public appearances, although her depression makes it exhausting. Miss Skerrett reveals to the Queen that it was her cousin, Eliza, who sold the story about the palace thief to the newspapers. Victoria prepares to remove Skerrett from the palace, but Albert persuades her to allow her to remain.
13	5	"Entente Cordiale"	Jim Loach	Daisy Goodwin	24 September 2017	6.13
Robert Peel expresses his concerns to Victoria that the King of France, Louis Philippe I is planning to marry his son, Duke of Montpensier, to the Queen Isabel II of Spain. Peel fears that an alliance between France and Spain could be contrary to Britain's interest, and so Victoria travels to France to persuade Louis Philippe to consider an alternative. Victoria is annoyed at the King's constant refusal to discuss the topic and at Albert's distant behaviour. Albert reveals his fear that he may be illegitimate, but Victoria reassures him that it doesn't matter. They talk to Louis Philippe about the marriage and are convinced that he is against it. On returning to England, Victoria learns that Louis went ahead with the marriage. They discover that Victoria is pregnant again.
14	6	"Faith, Hope & Charity"	Jim Loach	Daisy Goodwin	1 October 2017	6.05
Victoria gives birth to a daughter, Alice, and Ernest returns to England for the christening. A severe famine in Ireland is caused by a potato blight. The vicar, Robert Traill, receives an apathetic response from the Protestant clergy, writes to Victoria seeking help, and she organises a meeting with him. Peel refuses to help, claiming that showing any form of favouritism, especially to the Irish, would cause unrest and resentment at home. Albert works on improving the palace and of the City of London's sanitation with the Royal Society. Ernest secretly sees a doctor for his syphilis. After meeting Victoria, Traill falls sick with typhus, and dies. Francatelli gives Cleary his gold watch to pawn for her family; Cleary is later distressed when she discovers that her relatives have emigrated to the United States.
15	7	"The King Over the Water"	Daniel O'Hara	Ottilie Wilford	8 October 2017	6.47
After another attempt is made to assassinate Victoria, she and Albert decide to travel to the Scottish Highlands, staying with the Duke of Atholl at Blair Castle in Perthshire. While out on a ride, they tire of the entertainment and escape to the countryside to spend time alone. They become lost and seek refuge with an elderly couple in their small home. Victoria and Albert find themselves at peace during this brief freedom, but are found the following morning. Edward Drummond, personal secretary to the Prime Minister, who is scheduled to marry for political purposes, enjoys his time with Lord Alfred Paget, and they passionately kiss. Ernest, who previously received news from Albert that the Duchess of Sutherland's husband has died, successfully flirts with her.
16	8	"The Luxury of Conscience"	Daniel O'Hara	Daisy Goodwin	15 October 2017	6.40
Peel puts to parliament the ideas of repealing the Corn Laws and making international trade tariff-free, but faces opposition. However, his cause is supported by Albert who attends a session of parliament; his presence and Peel are mocked by both Tories and Whigs. A romance develops between Francatelli and Skerrett. When Leopold arrives unexpectedly, Albert is unsettled. Victoria later quarrels with Albert when he expresses his fears that Baroness Lehzen is improperly caring for their children. When their eldest daughter falls ill and is diagnosed with a very serious fever, Victoria relents and dismisses Lehzen. Peel's bill is passed. Drummond is shot dead shielding Peel from an assassin outside the Palace of Westminster. Peel resigns as Prime Minister. Ernest's syphilis presents indications so he breaks off with the Duchess. Leopold tries to improve his relationship with Victoria and Albert.
Special
17	–	"Comfort and Joy"	Jim Loach	Daisy Goodwin	25 December 2017	5.44
During the Christmas of 1846, Albert introduces the court to Christmas trees, and begins decorating the halls. He invites Victoria's mother to Christmas, without seeking Victoria's approval. An African princess, Sarah, is given to Victoria as a gift by the King of Dahomey. Victoria tries her best to make Sarah feel welcome within the palace, despite Albert's advice. King Leopold continues his attempts to marry Ernest to a wealthy princess from Germany. Ernest continues to admire Duchess Harriet, while keeping secret his illness from the Duchess. Paget, still mourning Drummond's death, eventually proposes and becomes engaged to Wilhelmina, the great-niece of the Duchess of Buccleuch. Penge's financial hope from a railway scheme connecting Leeds to Thirsk comes to nothing. Nancy receives an inheritance from her uncle, which she declines on discovering that it is valued in slaves. She is engaged to Francatelli. The royal couple argue over their expectations for the family Christmas, as well as Sarah's unhappiness, based on their painful childhoods. But after Albert almost drowns while skating, Victoria and Albert realise they must put their pasts aside in order to give their children a memorable Christmas.

=== Series 3 (2019) ===
No. overall	No. in series	Title	Directed by	Written by	Original US air date	Original UK air date	UK viewers (millions)
18	1	"Uneasy Lies the Head that Wears the Crown"	Geoffrey Sax	Daisy Goodwin	13 January 2019	24 March 2019	5.83
Victoria has had two more children: Prince Alfred and Princess Helena, and is heavily pregnant with her sixth child. As the revolutions of 1848 spread across the Continent, revolutionary ideas grow amongst Britain's working class. King Louis Philippe, now deposed by the French people in favour of a republic, requests asylum in Britain. Despite warnings from the Prime Minister Lord John Russell and the Foreign Secretary Lord Palmerston that hosting foreigners might turn public opinion against her, Victoria gives the former king permission to travel to London. Victoria's maternal half-sister, Princess Feodora of Leiningen, arrives unexpectedly at Buckingham Palace, seeking safety from revolutionaries in Germany. Inspired by the revolutions, the Chartists protest against the monarchy, and Albert insists the family retreat to Osborne House on the Isle of Wight. When Victoria and Albert agree to leave the next day, a Chartist protest outside the Palace culminates with a brick being thrown through the window where Victoria was standing, and the shock causes her water to break.
19	2	"London Bridge is Falling Down"	Geoffrey Sax	Daisy Goodwin	20 January 2019	31 March 2019	5.12
Victoria goes into labour as the Chartists continue their protests at the palace gates, although they soon pull back. Victoria gives birth to her fourth daughter, Princess Louise, named after Albert's mother. The Prime Minister, along with Lord Palmerston and the Duke of Wellington, asks Victoria to sign the order to deploy troops to block the Chartists. Victoria insists that the Chartists be allowed to deliver their charter to Westminster as they are a peaceful movement, and she refuses to sign. When she learns that a police search conducted at the Chartists' headquarters had found numerous rifles, Victoria believes they were meant to kill her and signs the order. Albert confronts Louis Philippe after he frightens both Vicky and Bertie into believing Victoria will be executed by guillotine, and decides their family must depart for Osborne House. Lord Palmerston rescues the Duchess of Monmouth after her carriage is attacked. After passing soldiers guarding the bridge to Westminster, Victoria changes her mind and decides to let the Chartists through. After arriving at Osborne, Victoria receives a report from the Duke that the Chartists had safely delivered the charter, and is frustrated that she was not there.
20	3	"Et in Arcadia"	Geoffrey Sax	Guy Andrews	27 January 2019	7 April 2019	N/A (<5.36) (Note: Not reported in the weekly top 15 programmes for four-screen viewer ratings.)
While the Royal Family stays at Osborne House, Victoria gets word that Palmerston is hosting Lajos Kossuth, the Hungarian democrat and leader of its constitutionalists, who is supported by many in Parliament. Victoria sees it as an act of insubordination; she and Albert argue about returning to London. Instead, Victoria invites Lord Palmerston and Lord Russell to stay at Osborne to discuss the issue. Victoria and Albert clash over how to raise Bertie. Victoria and Palmerston come to a mutual understanding and she allows him to dine with Kossuth. Francatelli resigns and encourages a reluctant Nancy to do the same so they can start a new life together. Nancy informs Victoria of her resignation and marriage. The Royal Family returns to London at Victoria's insistence. Victoria attempts to visit Albert in his office, but he locks himself in, ignoring her pleas.
21	4	"Foreign Bodies"	Chloë Thomas	Ottilie Wilford	3 February 2019	14 April 2019	N/A (<5.59)
Victoria and Albert exchange letters arguing about whether Albert should leave for Cambridge University after being offered the position of Chancellor, and about Bertie's education. Victoria wants him by her side for a reception for foreign ambassadors after Louise's christening. She learns of a cholera outbreak that has hit London. Physician John Snow suspects that contaminated water is the cause but is presumed to be a crank. Albert makes a speech at Cambridge advocating modernisation of the curriculum, stimulating conservative Earl of Powis to compete with Albert for the Chancellorship. Although Albert wins the election, he attempts to decline, believing that the students won't support him. Albert accepts after encouragement from Lord Palmerston, who reveals that he had voted for Albert. Victoria visits the cholera hospital and encounters nurse Florence Nightingale, who comments that Snow is the only doctor who really cares about the patients. Afterwards, Victoria insists on meeting him to hear his theory. Nancy reveals to Francatelli that she is pregnant, but later contracts cholera after drinking a tonic to cure morning sickness, unaware it was made with contaminated water. Snow locates the source of the disease, a pump in Soho, and has it shut down. After visiting Nancy before she dies, Victoria reads the letter from Nancy that she previously ignored and seeks comfort from Albert, who has returned home, and they reconcile. Francatelli names the hotel "Nancy's", after his late wife.
22	5	"A Show of Unity"	Chloë Thomas	Guy Andrews	10 February 2019	21 April 2019	N/A (<5.41)
Victoria suffers another assassination attempt during a carriage ride with her two eldest children and Sophie, the Duchess of Monmouth. She learns from Abigail that although the Great Famine in Ireland is drawing to a close, there is a strong movement for Irish independence. Victoria decides to visit after she realises that no monarch of the United Kingdom has visited Ireland since the Middle Ages. Bertie stays in London with his new tutor, Mr Caine, while Feodora is supposed to watch the other children. At Palmerston's estate near Sligo, Victoria learns of the open marriage between Lord and Lady Palmerston. Albert asks Lord Palmerston where his tenants have gone and Palmerston explains that he helped them emigrate to New York. Sophie grows closer to Joseph, the footman. Returning home, Victoria discovers Caine abusing Bertie while teaching him. Horrified, Albert worries that he will damage his children and is grateful they will not have any more, until Victoria tells him she is again pregnant.
23	6	"A Coburg Quartet"	Chloë Thomas	Daisy Goodwin	17 February 2019	28 April 2019	N/A (<5.47)
Victoria's maternal uncle, King Leopold of Belgium, arrives for the christening of her seventh child, Prince Arthur. Victoria discovers that some private drawings by herself and Albert have been copied and printed by the press, which she sees as an affront to her dignity. Abigail and Lord Palmerston tell her she is actually becoming more popular. Albert has a phrenologist study Bertie's head and becomes worried that both Victoria and Bertie have inherited George III's temperament. Feodora organises a Georgian era-themed christening ball, but Victoria is unhappy that Feodora has sold tickets to unsuitable guests. During the ball, Feodora reveals to Victoria that their mother and Leopold sent her away after Victoria's paternal uncle, King George IV, tormented his brothers by entertaining the possibility of marrying Feodora and producing an heir. Sophie, the Duchess of Monmouth, begins an affair with Joseph, the footman. Victoria comes to believe that Feodora hates her and to fear that Albert no longer loves her.
24	7	"A Public Inconvenience"	Delyth Thomas	Ottilie Wilford	24 February 2019	5 May 2019	N/A (<5.67)
Lord Palmerston and Albert struggle against public opinion - Lord Palmerston for his gunboat diplomacy response to the mistreatment of Don Pacifico in Greece, and Albert for his ambitious project for a great exhibition to celebrate industrial technology. Victoria reduces Feodora's influence by inviting Feodora's daughter, Adelheid, to England as a friendly overture. Sophie, the Duchess of Monmouth, considers running away with Joseph, but her husband arranges for two doctors to imprison her for insanity. Concerned Albert will be humiliated if the exhibition fails, Victoria tries to distract him by offering the post of Commander-in-Chief, but Albert declines. While Lord Palmerston regains public approval, Albert is discouraged by setbacks to his project and decides to become Commander-in-Chief. Victoria decides to support his dream regardless of the outcome, and Albert finds an architect who can create a design that helps the Great Exhibition to succeed. Albert explains to Victoria that after ten years of marriage their love has changed but still exists.
25	8	"The White Elephant"	Delyth Thomas	Daisy Goodwin	3 March 2019	12 May 2019	4.79
The Great Exhibition is a great success, to the royal family's relief, and Albert is cheered by the crowd. Victoria forces the Duke of Monmouth to allow his imprisoned wife to attend, where Joseph arranges for her to flee with him the next day, planning to emigrate to the United States. However, Victoria confronts Sophie, chiding her for considering the notion of abandoning her son, and offers to get her a house separate from the Duke. Sophie still plans to run away that night, as Joseph waits for her at Euston Station, to take a train to port, to sail to America. But as she is trying to slip out of the house unnoticed, she is confronted by her son, leaving her escape in doubt. Lord Palmerston's public declaration of support for Napoleon III creates adverse reaction in Parliament that forces him to resign as foreign secretary, though he and his wife decide to stay in London as Palmerston seeks to become Prime Minister. Victoria and Albert's relationship with Feodora comes to a head when she admits to contemplating Lord Palmerston's suggestion of a marriage between her daughter and Napoleon III, and not to a relative of the Crown Prince of Prussia as Albert wished. Feodora storms out of Victoria's room vowing to leave for good, but Victoria makes one last attempt at reconciliation. The final episode ends in uncertainty as Albert, while talking to Victoria, suddenly collapses onto the palace floor, unresponsive.

== Production ==
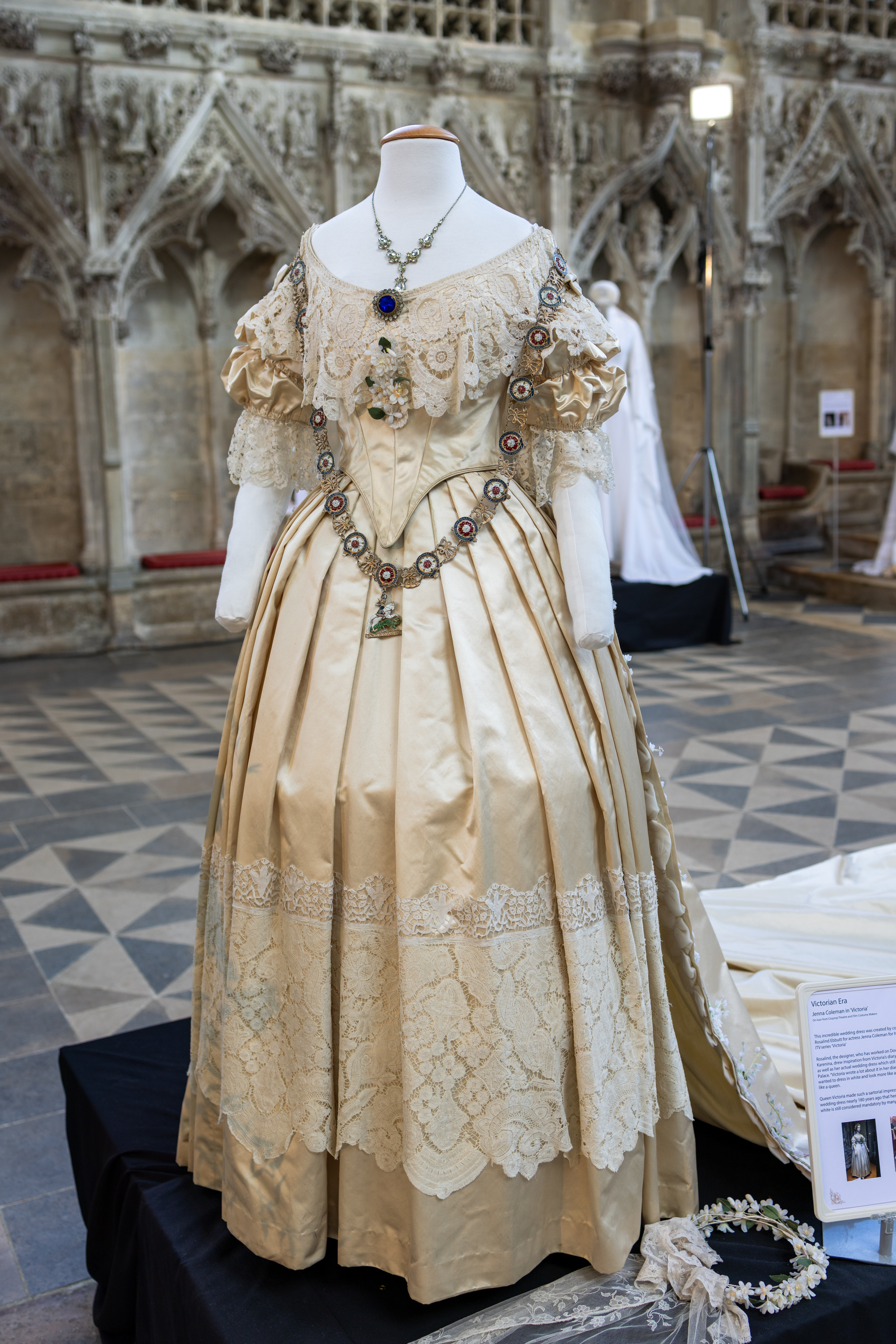
Wedding dress worn by Jenna Coleman as Queen Victoria

=== Development ===
The series was announced in September 2015, following Coleman's decision to leave Doctor Who to join the cast as Queen Victoria. Daisy Goodwin said in October 2016 that a Christmas special episode for the 2016 series had been proposed and was rejected by ITV; one was subsequently commissioned for 2017 after the rising ratings popularity for Victoria.

In September 2016, ITV renewed Victoria for a second series, followed by a Christmas special. In December 2017, Victoria was renewed for a third series, with Coleman and Hughes set to return. Beyond the renewal, ITV administration reportedly expects Victoria to run for a total of six series, although whether Jenna Coleman would remain as the lead actress as the series moves into depicting Victoria's later years was uncertain. After the conclusion of the third series, Coleman stated that the programme would "take a break" while a fourth series was planned. In July 2021, ITV stated "there are no plans presently to film Victoria, but that's not to say we won't revisit the series with the production team at a later date."

Producers Mammoth Screen picked Screen Yorkshire's Church Fenton Studios which is in Tadcaster North Yorkshire, as the central base for the recreation of Buckingham Palace. Church Fenton Studios recently launched, so Victoria subsequently became the first production to film there. It is the first time Yorkshire has needed a large scale studio space to host a major drama. Mammoth Screen spent seven months filming the first series in Yorkshire.

=== Filming ===
Much of Victoria is filmed in Yorkshire. The interiors of Castle Howard double as Kensington Palace, Harewood House stands in for Buckingham Palace, with Bramham Park and Wentworth Woodhouse also being in use for both royal residences. Carlton Towers is in use as Windsor Castle, while Beverley Minster replaces Westminster Abbey. Other locations include Raby Castle, Allerton Castle, Newby Hall and Whitby West Pier. Church Fenton Studios, a converted aircraft hangar at Leeds East Airport near Selby, was in use to recreate some interiors of Buckingham Palace. Parts of Liverpool's Georgian quarter were used for exterior locations for the filming of the third series.

Filming for first series began in early 2016. The second series was filmed in early 2017 and the third series began filming in May 2018, after filming for The Cry, another series that Coleman starred in, commenced in Australia in February 2018, and concluded in May 2018, so that production on the third series of Victoria could commence.

=== Music ===
Victoria (Original Soundtrack)

Soundtrack album by Martin Phipps and Ruth Barrett
- Released: January 12, 2017
- Genre: Soundtrack
- Length: 28:03
- Label: Dubois

Victoria music chronology
Victoria (Original Soundtrack) (2017)	Victoria, Vol. 2 & 3 (2021)

Martin Phipps soundtrack chronology
War & Peace (2017)	Victoria (Original Soundtrack) (2017)	Black Earth Rising (2018)

Ruth Barrett soundtrack chronology
Cinematic Beauty (2011)	Victoria (Original Soundtrack) (2017)	City of Tiny Lights (2017)

The theme song is by Martin Phipps, sung by the Mediæval Bæbes. Phipps also wrote and conducted incidental music for the early episodes. For later episodes the conducting role was undertaken by Ruth Barrett. An official soundtrack for the first series was released digitally on 12 January 2017. A CD issue followed in 2018.

No.	Title	Performers	Length
1.	"Victoria – The Suite"	Benji Merrison, Mediæval Bæbes	3:27
2.	"The King is Dead"		2:49
3.	"Coronation"	Mediæval Babes	3:15
4.	"Lord M"		2:44
5.	"Locomotives"		1:52
6.	"Mirrors"		1:32
7.	"The Wedding"	Mediæval Babes	3:43
8.	"The Royal Birth"		2:14
9.	"Privy Council"		2:50
10.	"A Royal Affair"		2:05
11.	"Victoria Titles"	Mediæval Babes	1:35
Total length:			28:03

Victoria, Vol. 2 & 3

Soundtrack album by Ruth Barrett
- Released: February 22, 2019
- Genre: Soundtrack
- Length: 52:49
- Label: Dubois

Victoria music chronology
Victoria (Original Soundtrack) (2017)	Victoria, Vol. 2 & 3 (2019)

Ruth Barrett soundtrack chronology
Bodyguard (2018)	Victoria, Vol. 2 & 3 (2019)	The Durrells (2019)

On 23 February 2019, Barrett posted via her Instagram she would be releasing a second official soundtrack to accompany the second and third series. The second official soundtrack was released 22 February 2019 via Amazon for the United States and will be released at a later date for the United Kingdom.

No.	Title	Performers	Length
1.	"Allelujah (Arrangement of Theme by Martin Phipps)"	Gillie Mackenzie	2:38
2.	"Adoration"		2:13
3.	"Osborne House"		1:45
4.	"Little Flame"		2:57
5.	"Reflection"		2:45
6.	"The Crown"		3:56
7.	"Cholera"		1:45
8.	"Skinny Dipping"		2:06
9.	"Fever Rising"		3:30
10.	"French Court"		3:25
11.	"Going to Ireland"		2:09
12.	"Albert Wears the Crown"		4:32
13.	"Inspecting the Regiment"		1:33
14.	"Babies"		2:13
15.	"Albert's Plan"		1:31
16.	"Broken Marriage"		2:47
17.	"Time of Enchantment"		2:49
18.	"Matchmaking"		2:33
19.	"Rain"		2:05
20.	"The Duchess"		1:49
21.	"The Great Exhibition"		1:48
Total length:			52:49

== Release ==
=== Broadcast ===
The eight-episode first series premiered on ITV on 28 August 2016 in the UK, and on PBS on 15 January 2017 in the United States as part of Masterpiece. The series premiered on 4 April 2017 in Canada on Vision TV, and January 2019 on ViuTV6 in Hong Kong.

The eight-episode second series premiered on ITV on 27 August 2017, and on PBS on 14 January 2018. The second series premiered in Canada on 26 September 2018 on Vision TV.

The eight-episode third series was broadcast on PBS from 13 January to 3 March 2019, before the series was broadcast in the UK, where it aired on ITV from 24 March to 12 May 2019.

=== Home media ===
In Region 2, the first series of Victoria was released on DVD and Blu-ray on 10 October 2016. The second series was released on DVD and Blu-ray on 13 November 2017. The 2017 feature-length Christmas Special was released on DVD 26 December 2017.

In Region 1, the first series of Victoria was released on DVD and Blu-ray on 31 January 2017. The second series of Victoria was released on DVD and Blu-ray on 30 January 2018.

== Reception ==
=== Critical reception ===
The critics' reviews of the first series have been positive. On Rotten Tomatoes, the series holds a rating of 80%, based on 40 reviews, with an average rating of 6.77/10. The site's consensus reads: "Strong performances by Jenna Coleman and Rufus Sewell hint at Downton-esque potential for Victoria, but the narrative falls just shy of that soapy mark."

The second series holds a rating of 87%, based on 15 reviews, with an average rating of 6.17/10. The site's consensus reads: "Victoria's sophomore series finds this striking period drama returning with a second batch of episodes that are just as absorbing as its first." On Metacritic, the first series has a score of 67 out of 100, based on 22 critics, indicating "generally favourable reviews".

Mehera Bonner of Marie Claire wrote: "Stunning, addictive...and ridiculously romantic". Matthew Gilbert of The Boston Globe wrote: "Captivating [and] unforgettable". In contrast, Hank Stuever of The Washington Post wrote of the first series "Predictable to the bone", and Verne Gay of Newsday of the second series, "it feels like sanitized history".

=== Historical accuracy ===
Victoria's writer Daisy Goodwin said that the drama was inspired by real events: "...whether they are assassination attempts, the repeal of the Corn Laws, or the terrible potato famine...All the big building blocks of the series are true."

The Duchess of Sutherland is inaccurately depicted as carrying on an improbable romance with prince (later duke) Ernest of Saxe-Coburg and Gotha, who is also inaccurately depicted as being unmarried at the time. Margaret Clunie told RadioTimes.com: "Harriet Sutherland had a famously happy marriage with the Duke of Sutherland and they had these 11 children and lived happily ever after. So we have slightly deviated away from the truth."

The story lines are a blending of history, historical inaccuracies, and characters invented for dramatic purposes. In some cases, the historical figures are indistinguishable from invented characters in all but name, with the traits, actions, and experiences having little to do with the real lives of those supposedly portrayed. For example, Dame Diana Rigg was cast to play an elderly and curmudgeonly Duchess of Buccleuch even though the real woman was in her 30s when at court, and older sister Feodora is made into a spiteful schemer living for an extended period of some years with Victoria and Albert, although letters reveal the sisters seemingly had an affectionate bond that made them faithful correspondents across years and distance, with visits relatively rare.

Robert Peel's Private Secretary Edward Drummond is shown as having a relationship with Lord Alfred Paget, but there is no evidence that either of the men were homosexuals or had any same-sex relationships. Drummond was fatally shot in 1843, not in 1846, as portrayed. His shooting was likely a case of mistaken identity, rather than his being shot when defending Peel. He was aged 51 when he died, so was considerably older than the character featured in the series. Paget did not become the Queen's Chief Equerry until 1846. He was born in 1816, so at the time portrayed he would have been of an age similar to the character in the series.

Frances Mulraney wrote on IrishCentral that "Faith, Hope & Charity" episode "overplays the extent to which Queen Victoria sought to aid the famine Irish in the 1840s, exaggerating her interest in Ireland." English-born historian Christine Kinealy, founding director of Ireland's Great Hunger Institute at Quinnipiac University, who has studied Queen Victoria's diaries and the writings of Prime Ministers Peel and Russell, said: "There is no evidence that she had any real compassion for the Irish people in any way." Irish clergyman Robert Traill, who wrote a letter that makes it to the newspapers, never met Victoria. The creator of the show, Daisy Goodwin, said: "I thought [Robert Traill's] story would be a good way to illustrate the terrible way in which the Irish were treated by the British government."

=== Accolades ===
Year	Award	Category	Nominee(s)	Result	Ref
2017	British Academy Television Craft Awards	Best Make Up and Hair Design	Nic Collins	Nominated	
2017	Primetime Creative Arts Emmy Awards	Outstanding Music Composition for a Series (Original Dramatic Score)	Martin Phipps, Ruth Barrett, Natalie Holt for "Doll 123"	Nominated	
2017	Primetime Creative Arts Emmy Awards	Outstanding Main Title Theme Music	Martin Phipps	Nominated	
