= Altar Wedge Tomb =

- Tuama Dingeach na hAltóra (Irish)
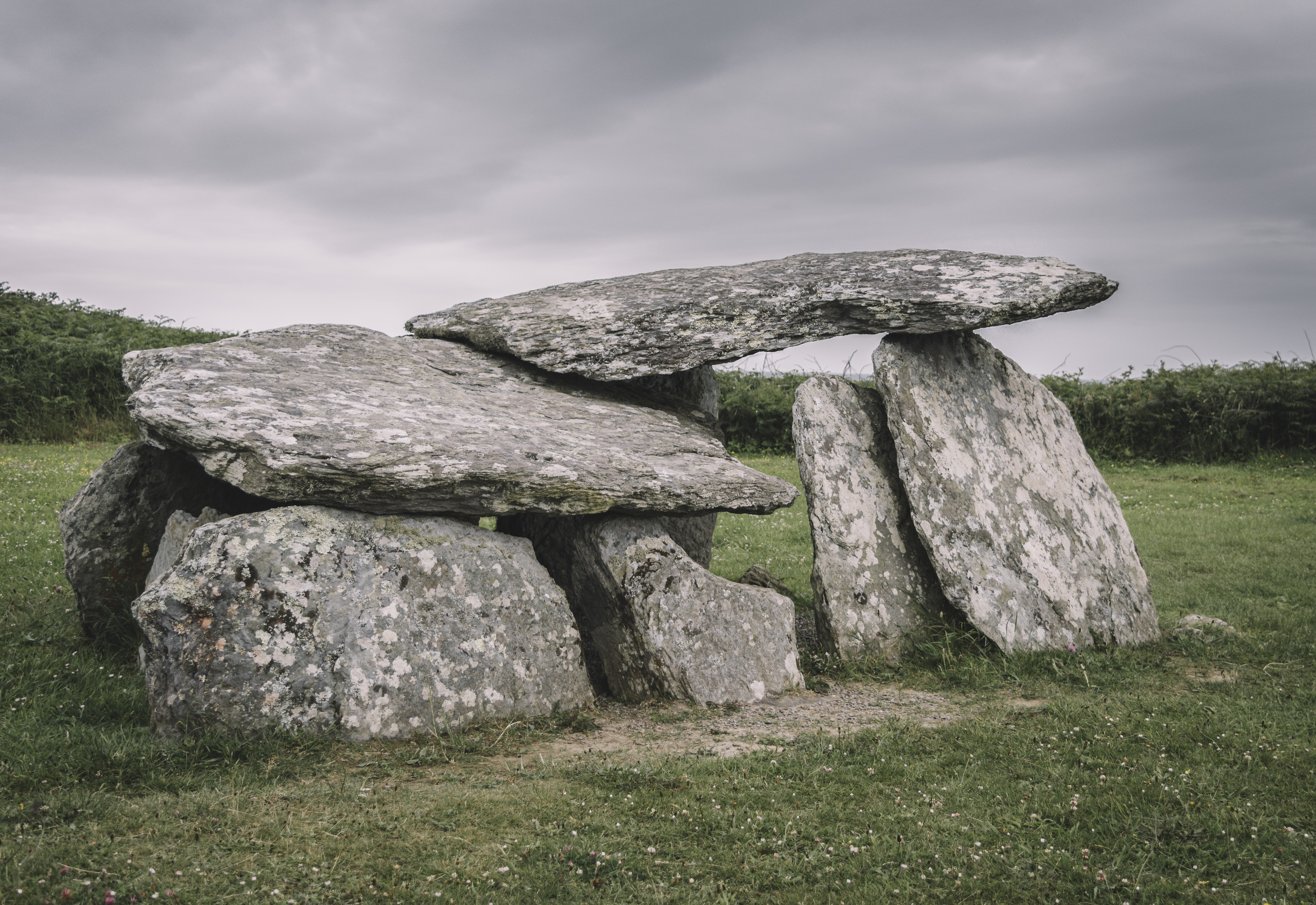
- The tomb in 2016

- Location within Ireland
- 51.513756°N 9.644037°W
- Type: wedge-shaped gallery grave
- Location: Altar, Schull, County Cork, Ireland

History
- Built: c. 2500 BC

Site notes
- Material: Stone
- Length: 3.42 m (11.2 ft)
- Width: 1.9 m (6 ft 3 in)

National monument of Ireland
- Official name: Altar
- Reference no.: 645

The Altar Wedge Tomb is a wedge-shaped gallery grave and national monument located outside the village of Schull, in County Cork, Ireland.

== Location ==
Altar Wedge Tomb is located 6.7 km (4.2 mi) WSW of Schull, on a cliffedge near Toormore Bay.

== History ==
Wedge tombs of this kind were built in Ireland in the late Neolithic and early Bronze Age, c. 2500–2000 BC.

Cremated burials took place around 2000 BC and pit burials around 1200 BC. Around 200, a pit was dug and filled in with fish, shellfish and cetacean bones, presumably as a ritual practice.

Despite the name, there is no evidence that the "altar" was ever used for sacrifice. During penal times, it was used as a Mass rock in the 18th century. A holy well stood across the road.

It was excavated in summer 1989 by Dr. William O'Brien and Madeline Duggan. Material found included cremated human bones, a tooth, worked flint, charcoal, periwinkles, fish bones, and limpets.

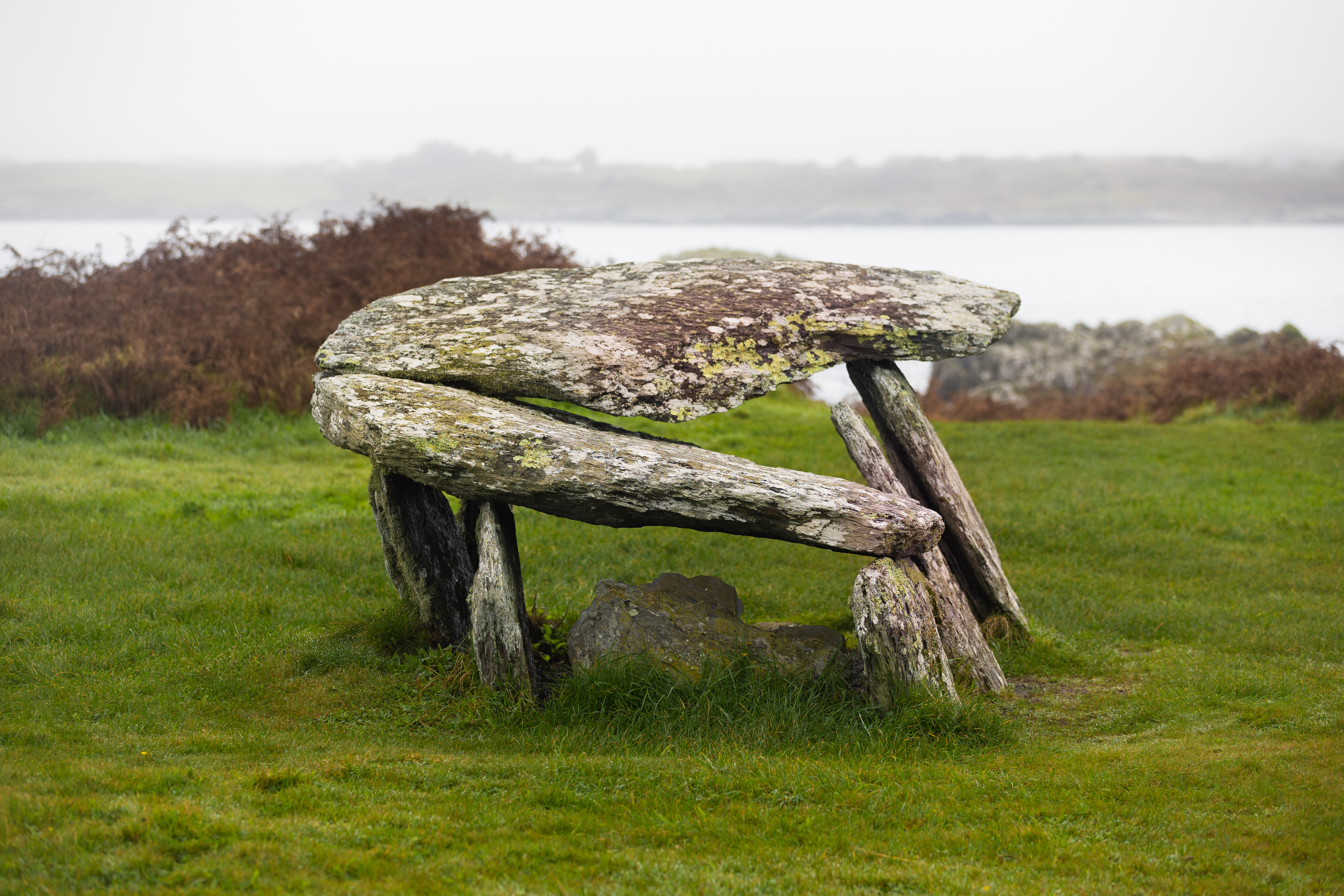
View along the ENE–WSW axis, facing Mizen Peak

== Description ==
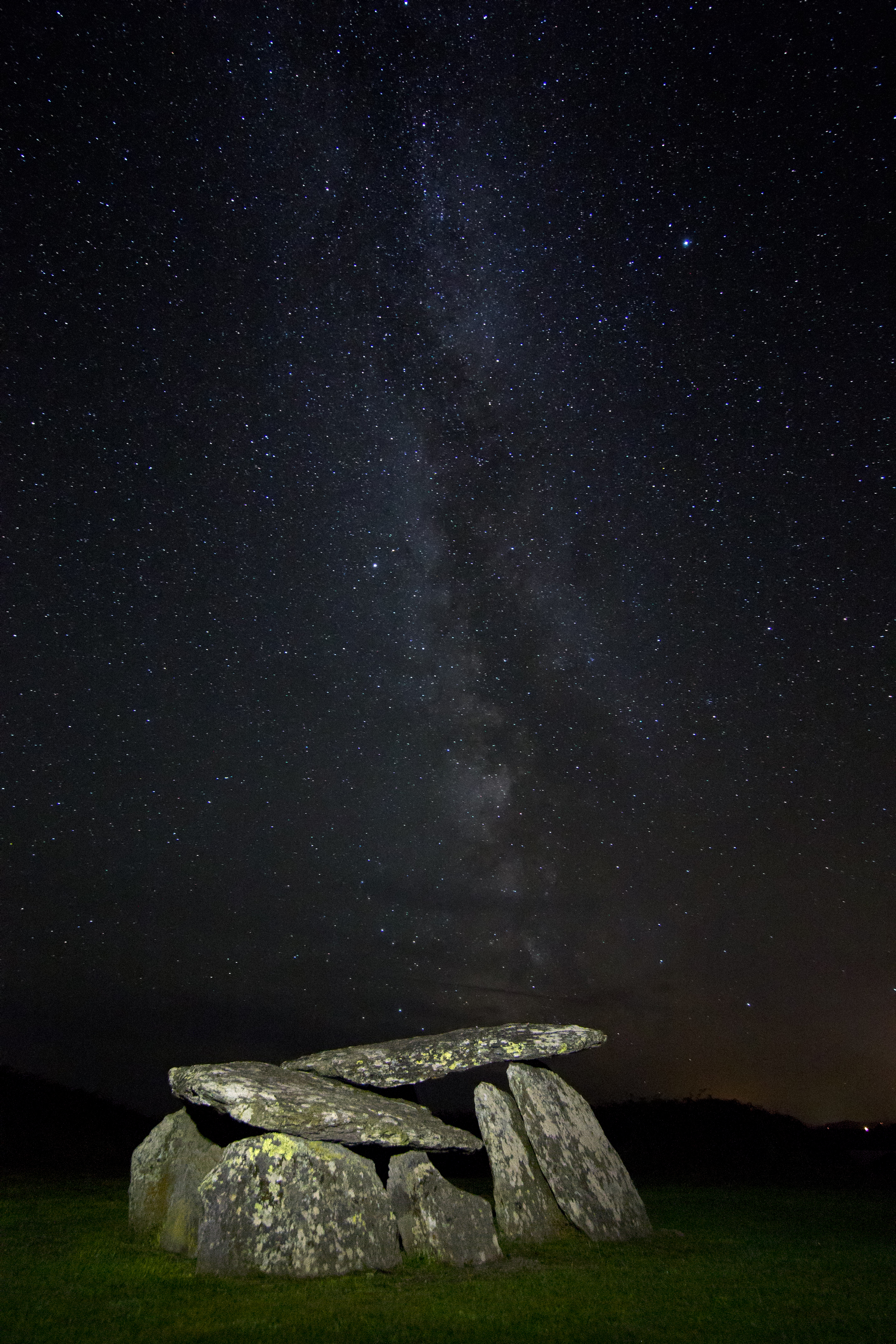
Altar wedge tomb at night

The entrance was aligned ENE–WSW, possibly with Mizen Peak (Carn Uí Néit) and maybe to catch the setting sun at Samhain (1 November).

The tomb consists of a trapezoidal orthostatic gallery 3.42 m (11.2 ft) long, 1.9 m (6 ft 3 in) wide at the west end 1.25 m (4 ft 1 in) at the east.

A roof-stone 2.7 m (8 ft 10 in) long is still above the east end, and a second rests against the westerly stones at either side of the gallery. There is no cairn material or evidence of kerbstones; they may have been removed for road construction in the 19th century.
