= Robert Traill (Irish clergyman) =

Church of Ireland clergyman

The Reverend Doctor Robert Traill
- Rector of Schull
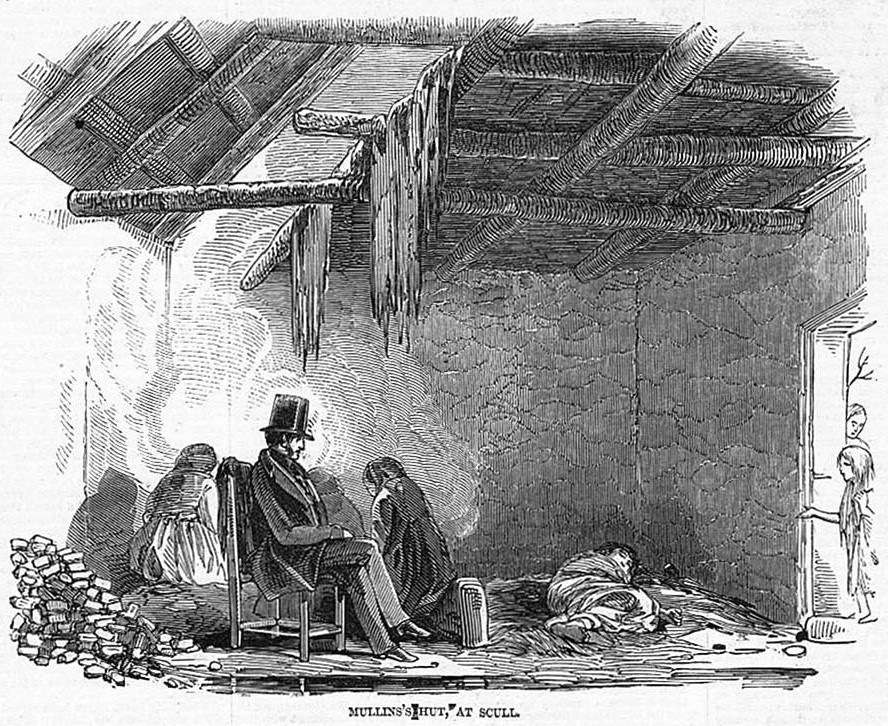
- Mahony's sketch of Traill visiting a dying man in 1847
- Church: Church of Ireland
- Diocese: Cork, Cloyne and Ross
- In office: 1832–1847

Personal details
- Born: Robert Traill; 1793 Lisburn, County Antrim
- Died: 1847 (aged 53–54) Schull, County Cork

Robert Traill or Trail FRSE (1793–1847) was a clergyman in the established Church of Ireland. He was rector of Schull, County Cork from 1832 until his death and part-owned a copper mine in the area. Traill complained of losing tithes from the Roman Catholic population due to the 1830s Tithe War but was recognised for his compassion during the Great Famine in Ireland from 1846. He was depicted in an Illustrated London News article of the time and was the subject of a letter published in several newspapers.

== Early career ==
Traill was born in Lisburn, County Antrim on 15 July 1793 and graduated from Trinity College, Dublin in 1814. He spent some time in France and Italy before travelling to England where he was ordained by Henry Ryder, Bishop of Gloucester in 1820. He afterwards worked as a curate in Ireland. He earned the degree of Doctor of Divinity and afterward, in 1832, was appointed the rector of Schull, County Cork. He antagonised some local people with his fervent evangelical Christianity. He translated some of the manuscripts of Josephus, a first-century Jewish historian, into English.

In 1840 he was elected a Fellow of the Royal Society of Edinburgh his proposer being Thomas Stewart Traill. As an "ordinary" fellow this indicates his physical presence in Edinburgh at that time, possibly to visit his cousin. He probably stayed with Traill at his grand townhouse, 10 Albyn Place on the Moray Estate.

Traill is said to have discovered copper at the Dhurode mine on Mizen Head which first operated between 1844 and 1846. He was a major shareholder in the mine and one of its six shafts was named after him.

Traill was involved in the Tithe War, in which many Roman Catholics refused to pay tithes for the evangelical established Church of Ireland, a fellow clergymen was killed within 30 miles of Schull, and Traill lamented that "the ungodly are rising up, and these poor deluded Roman Catholics are caballing to deprive me of my tithes, alas! What wickedness is this?".

== Great famine ==
At the outbreak of the Great Famine in 1845 Traill believed that the ventilation of the traditional storage of potatoes in pits would save them from the blight, and he worked on constructing these potato pit air shafts from October 1845. However he realised this would not be successful and by December was trying, in vain, to persuade the local landlords to let their tenants keep some grain so that they weren't forced to eat their seed potatoes. Traill established a relief committee for his parish and wrote widely to persuade people to subscribe to it. He was shown in the Illustrated London News visiting a dying man and his family, having been sketched by James Mahony who said of Traill that "his humanity at the present moment is beyond praise".

Traill established a soup kitchen at his home to provide for the needy and wrote that "my house is more like a beleaguered fortress. Ere the day has dawned the crowds are already gathering. My family one and all are perfect slaves worn out with attending them; for I would not wish, were it possible, that one starving creature would leave my door without some-thing to allay the cravings of hunger". In February 1847 he showed Commander James Crawford Caffin of HMS Scourge some of those in the parish affected by the famine. Caffin wrote to a friend that "In no house that I entered was there not to be found the dead or dying ... never in my life have I seen such wholesale misery, nor could I have thought it so complete." Caffin's letter was published in various newspapers, an act which brought some relief efforts from the British Government to Schull. However, by March this appeared to have ended when Traill stated "the distress was nothing in Captain Caffin's time compared with what it is now". Traill is said to have spent most of his income on relief for the needy.

== Personal life and death ==
Traill was married to Anne Hayes, daughter of Sir Samuel Hayes, 1st Baronet, in 1829. Traill died of "famine fever" (typhus) in April 1847. Upon his death he left a large family including two sons, three-year-old Robert Walter Traill and baby Edmund. The family moved to Dublin, where Robert studied civil engineering and Edmund medicine at Trinity College before they abandoned their studies to become ranchers in Argentina. Robert Walter Traill's son was Johnny Traill, the noted polo player. Another of Traill's grandsons was John Millington Synge, the playwright. His great-great-great granddaughter is TV producer and writer Daisy Goodwin. Goodwin wrote Traill into an episode of ITV's Victoria which told the story of the Great Famine, portraying a fictional meeting between the two. Traill was played by Martin Compston.
