= Daisy Goodwin =

British television producer

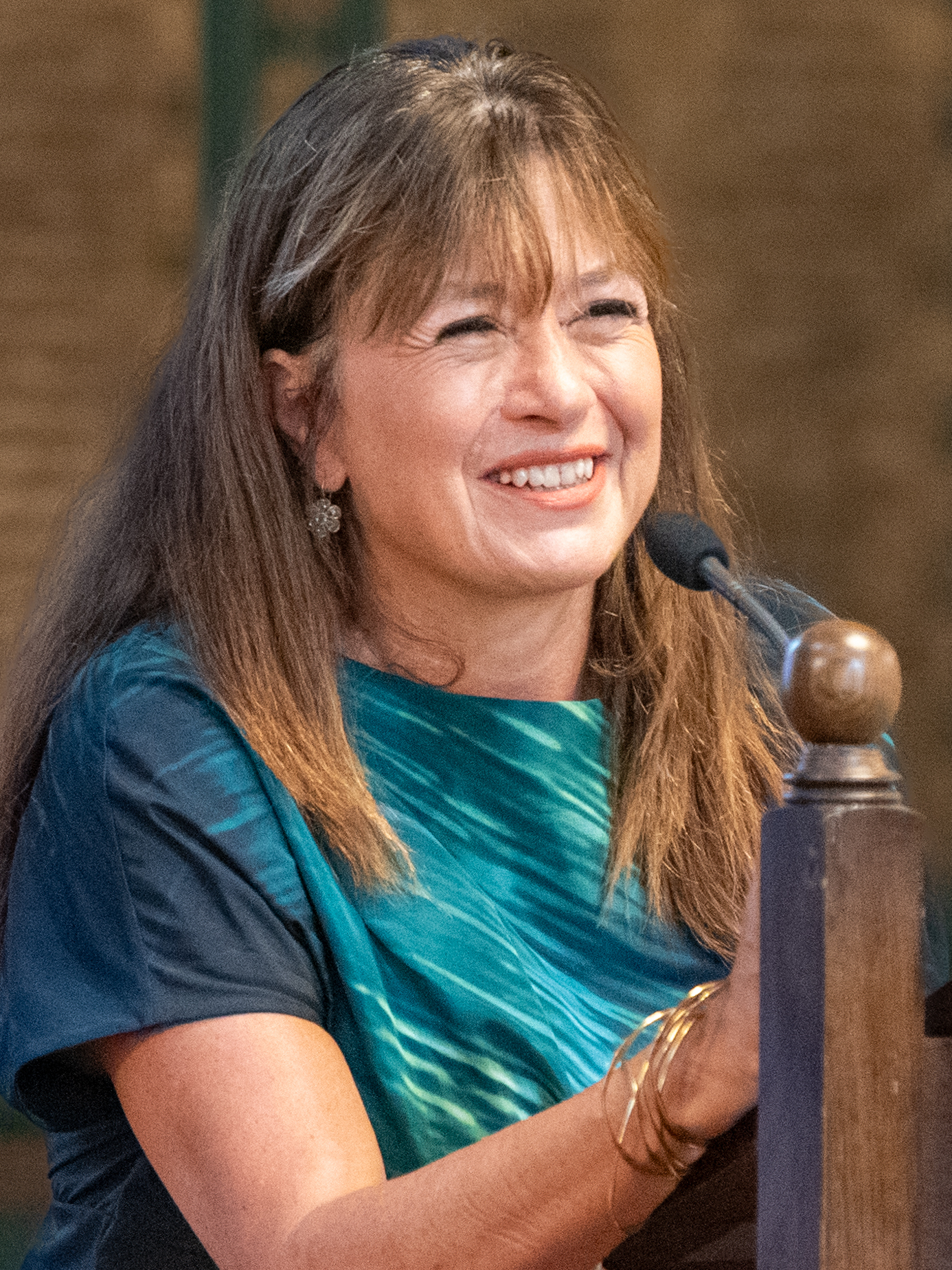
- Goodwin at the 2023 Chiswick Book Festival
- Born: Daisy Georgia Goodwin; 19 December 1961 (age 64); London, England
- Occupations: Screenwriter; novelist; television producer
- Parent(s): Richard B. Goodwin; Jocasta Innes
- Relatives: Jason Goodwin (half-brother); Robert Traill (great-great-great-grandfather)
- Writing career
- Period: 1985–present

Daisy Georgia Goodwin (born 19 December 1961) is an English screenwriter, TV producer and novelist. She is the creator of the ITV/ PBS show Victoria which has sold to 146 countries. She has written four novels: My Last Duchess or The American Heiress, The Fortune Hunter, Victoria, and Diva; all of which have been New York Times bestsellers and have been translated into more than ten languages. She has also curated eight poetry anthologies, including 101 Poems That Could Save Your Life. Goodwin spent twenty-five years working as a TV producer, where she created and produced shows like Grand Designs which has now been on Channel 4 for more than twenty years, and Escape to the Country which is in its twentieth year on BBC2.

== Early life ==
Goodwin was born and raised in London. She is the daughter of the film producer Richard B. Goodwin and the interior decorator Jocasta Innes. Her parents separated when she was five and then divorced. She is of Irish and Argentinian ancestry. In a 2019 interview by Rachel Ward of The Daily Telegraph she said: "I grew up surrounded by creative people" - she would return home "to find Lauren Bacall and Ingrid Bergman sat on the sofa having tea". Her great-great-great-grandfather was Irish clergyman Robert Traill, whose character she included in an episode of the second season of her TV drama Victoria which addressed the Irish famine in the 1840s. Traill was played by Martin Compston.

== Career ==
After being privately educated at both Queen's College, London and Westminster School, Goodwin studied history at Trinity College, Cambridge. She attended Columbia Film School as a Harkness Scholar and then, in 1985, joined the BBC as a trainee.

In 1998, Goodwin moved to Talkback Productions as head of factual programmes, becoming editorial director by 2003. In 2005, Goodwin founded Silver River Productions, which was sold to Sony in 2011. Her first novel, My Last Duchess, was published in the UK in August 2010 and, under the title The American Heiress, in the U.S. and Canada in June 2011. Goodwin has also compiled multiple poetry anthologies, the first being The Nation's Favourite Love Poems in 1997, and written a memoir entitled Silver River (2007). She was chairman of the judges for the 2010 Orange Prize for women's fiction, and commented in a New Statesman interview that "a recommendation from a woman is more interesting to me than what a man might tell me to read". She has presented television shows including Essential Poems (To Fall In Love With) (2003) and Reader, I Married Him (2006). Jane Thynne, in The Independent, described her as proving to be "triumphantly telegenic" in the former which was Goodwin's front of camera television debut.

Goodwin is the author of the novel Victoria (2016), and creator and writer of the TV series Victoria which was broadcast in the UK by ITV from 2016 to 2019 and in the U.S. by its co-commissioners, PBS/Masterpiece from 2017. Mike Hale, reviewing the series for The New York Times in early 2018, preferred Victoria over The Crown, the series about the reign of Queen Elizabeth II.

In a 2019 interview with the Radio Times, she claimed that repeats of Dad's Army were influencing Brexit.

== Personal life ==
Goodwin is married to Marcus Wilford, a television executive; they have two daughters. She appeared in the BBC television documentary Public School about Westminster directed by Jonathan Gili, and as part of the winning Trinity College, Cambridge, team on the Christmas University Challenge BBC2, 27 December 2011. In 2012, she appeared on a Children in Need episode of Only Connect alongside Charlie Higson and Matthew Parris.

In June 2023 Goodwin told The Times that in 2013 Daniel Korski, then a special adviser to David Cameron, had assaulted her by putting his hand on her breast during a meeting at Downing Street. She said she came forward following Korski seeking selection as the Conservative Party candidate for the London mayoral election in 2024. Korski denied the allegation. She later claimed that several other women had since come forward. Later that month Korski withdrew his candidacy.

== Production credits ==
=== BBC ===
- The Bookworm (1994)
- Looking Good (1997)
- Homefront

=== Talkback ===
Between 1998 and 2005 Goodwin worked as a producer or editor on shows including:

- How Clean Is Your House? (Channel 4)
- Jamie's Kitchen (Channel 4)
- Would Like to Meet (BBC2)
- House Doctor (Channel 5)
- Grand Designs (Channel 4)
- Other People's Houses (Channel 4)
- Your Money or Your Life (BBC2)
- Property Ladder (Channel 4)
- Life Doctor (Channel 5)
- Life Laundry (BBC2)
- Fame, Set and Match (BBC2)
- Escape to the Country (BBC2)
- She's Gotta Have It (Channel 4)
- Don't Look Down (BBC2)
- Lipstick Years (BBC2)

=== Silver River ===
- Pulling (2006)
- Bringing Up Baby (2007)
- I'm Running Sainsbury's (2009)
- The Supersizers... (2008-2009)
- Off By Heart (2009)
- Grow Your Own Drugs (2009)
- Kevin's Grand Tour (2009)
- If Walls Could Talk: The History of the Home (2011)

=== ITV ===
- Victoria (2016–2019)

== Acting credits ==
- Victoria (2016–), a cameo role as Lady Cecilia Underwood, Duchess of Inverness, episode 6: "The Queen's Husband"

== Publications ==
=== Prose ===
- Diva (2024) a novel based on the life of Maria Callas
- Victoria (2016)
- The Fortune Hunter (2014)
- My Last Duchess (2010), published in the U.S. and Canada as The American Heiress (2011)
- Off by Heart (2009)
- Silver River (2007)
- Bringing Up Baby: The New Mother's Companion (2007)
- The Nation's Favourite: Love Poems (1997)

=== Poetry anthologies ===
- Essential Poems for the Way We Live Now (2005)
- Essential Poems for Children: First Aid for Frantic Parents (2005)
- Poems to Last a Lifetime (2004)
- Essential Poems to Fall in Love With (2003)
- 101 Poems That Could Save Your Life (2003)
- 101 Poems to Get You Through the Day and Night: A Survival Kit for Modern Life (2003)
- 101 Poems to Keep You Sane: Emergency Rations for the Seriously Stressed (2003)
- 101 Poems To Help You Understand Men (and Women) (2003)

== Charities ==
Trustee of the London Library since 2018.

Trustee of the Purbeck International Chamber Music Festival founded by the cellist Natalie Clein 2022

Joined the board of the Women's Prize for Playwriting in 2022.

=== Action for Children ===
- Chair of Women Taking Action, Action for Children (formerly National Children's Home).

=== Maggie's ===
- 100 Poems to see You Through (2014). An anthology of poems with all proceeds going to Maggie's Centres.
