= Fastnet International Schools Regatta =

Bronze and silver fleet participants in 2006

Results to 2006 regatta (silver fleet)

The Fastnet International Schools Regatta is a Regatta that takes place each year in the County Cork village of Schull, Ireland.

The regatta involves three different fleets of participating sailors. Participants in each fleet are grouped by experience and ability, with novice sailors enter in the Bronze, intermediate sailors in the Silver fleet, and experienced race sailors in the Gold Fleet. On-the-water coaching is encouraged for the Bronze Fleet competitors.

All sailors are under 19 years of age, and each sailor racing represents his or her school.

The Regatta has been ongoing for 19 years (as of 2006) and is held in Schull harbour. It is hosted by The Fastnet Marine & Outdoor Education Centre. The name Fastnet comes from the most southernly point of Irish territory, Fastnet Rock, and previous years has seen the Gold fleet race in the vicinity of the Fastnet Rock.

There are different classes of boats that race each year, each with their own handicap that is calculated by a computer in the Marine OEC (Outdoor Education Centre).

== Boat classes ==
There are several classes of boat in the regatta each with their own handicap according to their ability. The handicap is calculated by a computer on site. During the races (usually 2–3 for Bronze/Silver and 3–5 for Gold - but there is no set number) the Bronze and Silver fleets race together on the same course, but the Gold fleet will race on its own. Classes and vessel types include:

- Topper (dinghy)
  - Topper Topaz
- Laser (dinghy)
  - Laser Radial
  - Laser 4.7
  - Laser 2 (dinghy)
- 420 (dinghy)
- Optimist (dinghy)
- Mirror (dinghy)
