= Schull and Skibbereen Railway =

Disused narrow gauge rail line in Ireland

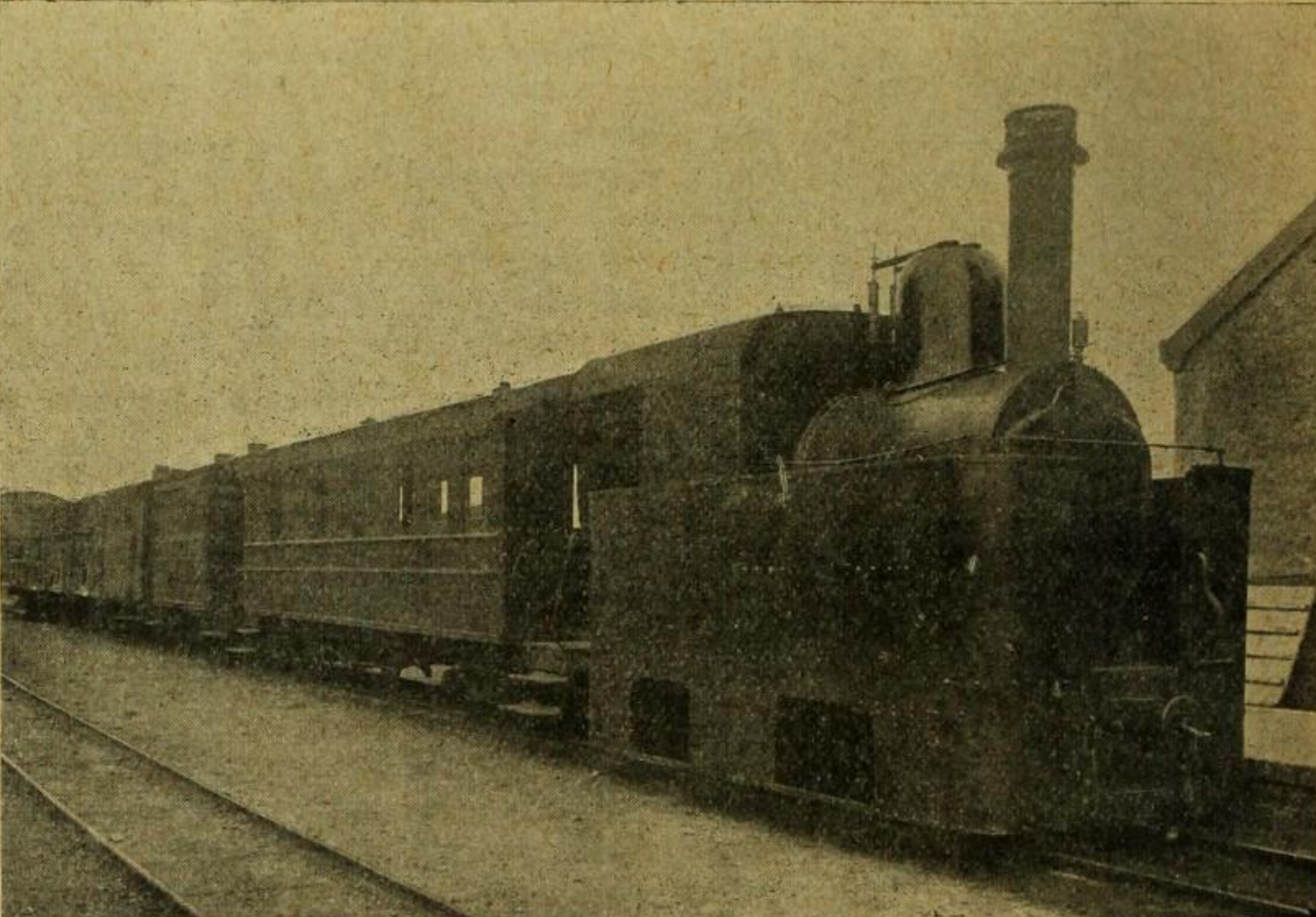
- No. 2 0-4-0T with train

Overview
- Status: Closed
- Coordinates: 51.5294°N 9.5406°W
- Termini: Schull; Skibbereen

History
- Opened: 1886
- Closed: 1947

Technical
- Line length: 15 1/2 miles (24.9 km)
- Number of tracks: 1
- Track gauge: 3 ft (914 mm)

The Schull and Skibbereen Railway (also known as the Schull and Skibbereen Tramway and Light Railway) was a minor narrow gauge railway in County Cork, Ireland. It opened in 1886 and closed in 1947. The track gauge was a 3 ft (914 mm) narrow gauge. The formal name of the company was The West Carberry Tramways and Light Railways Company Ltd.

== Route ==
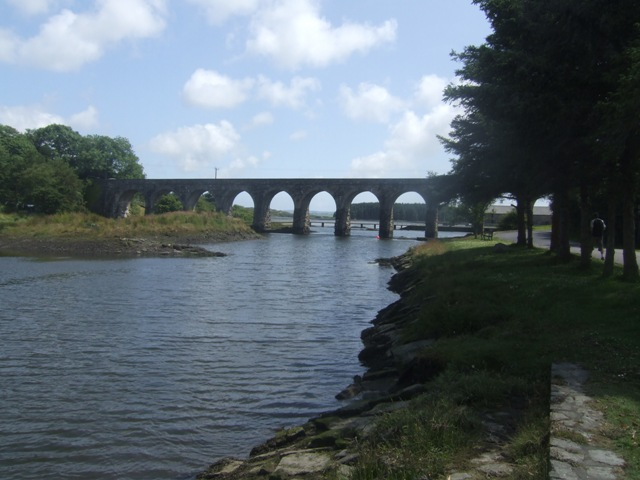
Ballydehob Viaduct across Roaringwater Bay

The S&S's main line was 15 1/2 miles (24.9 km) long. It was one of several in Ireland built under the terms of the Tramways and Public Companies (Ireland) Act 1883 (46 & 47 Vict. c. 43). It largely ran alongside roads, although a large 12-arched masonry viaduct was built over an inlet of Roaringwater Bay, and at times using gradients at steep as 1:30.

The line linked the small harbour and village at Schull (in Irish: Scoil Mhuire) with the town of Skibbereen (An Sciobairín). The only sizeable intermediate village was Ballydehob (Béal Átha an dá Chab), although the station was located inconveniently far from the village. The line was single track, with a passing place at Ballydehob station. Other halts were built at Newcourt, Church Cross, Hollyhill, Kilcoe and Woodlands (of which only Hollyhill had a station building).

The station at Skibbereen was built on a cramped site adjacent to that of the Cork, Bandon and South Coast Railway. The S&S trains had to reverse out of the station into a headshunt, before proceeding towards Schull. (A similar reversing operation is still required at Killarney railway station on Iarnród Éireann's line from Mallow to Tralee).

== Early years ==
Construction was begun in 1885 and soon proved to be substandard. The Inspector of Railways refused to allow the line to be opened for public service in August 1886. Following some remedial work and a subsequent inspection, the line opened in September with a restricted speed limit of only 15 miles per hour. In October the service had to be suspended for 10 days owing to problems with both the track and the locomotives. Services had to again be suspended in April 1887, with local ratepayers having to subsidise the company. The Inspector of Railways gave a highly critical report of the line's standards of operation.

Following further losses, in 1892 the Grand Jury of County Cork appointed a committee of management to run the line. In 1893 a short extension to Schull Pier was built, qualifying for a grant as it was an existing railway, the justification being fish traffic. (Note: Rowledge claims stock remained around until abandoned in 1954.)

== Ownership by the GSR and CIÉ ==
In 1925 the company was incorporated into the new Great Southern Railways. Owing to a shortage of coal during World War II (known as The Emergency in neutral Ireland), services had to be suspended between April 1944 and December 1945. In 1945 the GSR was incorporated into Córas Iompair Éireann (CIÉ). A further shortage of coal resulted in a renewed suspension of services on 27 January 1947. The line never reopened; CIÉ formally abandoned the railway in September 1952.

== Rolling stock ==
The line was operated by steam locomotives throughout its existence:

- SSLR 1 to 3 – Dick, Kerr 0-4-0T tramway locomotives of 1886 named Marion, Ida and Ilen.
- SSLR 4 – Nasmyth, Wilson & Co. 4–4–0T of 1888.
- SSLR 1 and 3 – Peckett and Sons 4–4–0T of 1906, and 1914.
- GSR 6S – ex CMLR 6.

== Services ==
The standard train service, journey time 80 minutes, were two mixed trains a day. morning and evening, except Sunday were there was one, supplemented by additional trains on fair days.

== See also ==
- List of narrow-gauge railways in Ireland
- West Cork

=== Other narrow gauge railways in County Cork ===
- Cork, Blackrock and Passage Railway
- Cork and Muskerry Light Railway

== Sources ==
- Bairstow, Martin (2012). Railways in Ireland. Vol. Part Five:Cork, Bandon & South Coast, ... ISBN 978-1871944426. OCLC 931336727.
- Casserley, H. C. (1974). Outline of Irish Railway History. Newton Abbot & North Pomfret: David & Charles. ISBN 0715363778. OCLC 249227042.
- LM (15 September 1906). "Schull and Skibbereen Light Railway". The Locomotive Magazine. Vol. 12, no. 169. OCLC 762067807.
- Rowledge, J. W. P. (1995). A regional history of railways. Vol. 16 – Ireland. Penryn: Atlantic Transport Publishers. ISBN 0-906899-63-X. OCLC 164930974.
