= Gothic Revival architecture =

Architectural movement

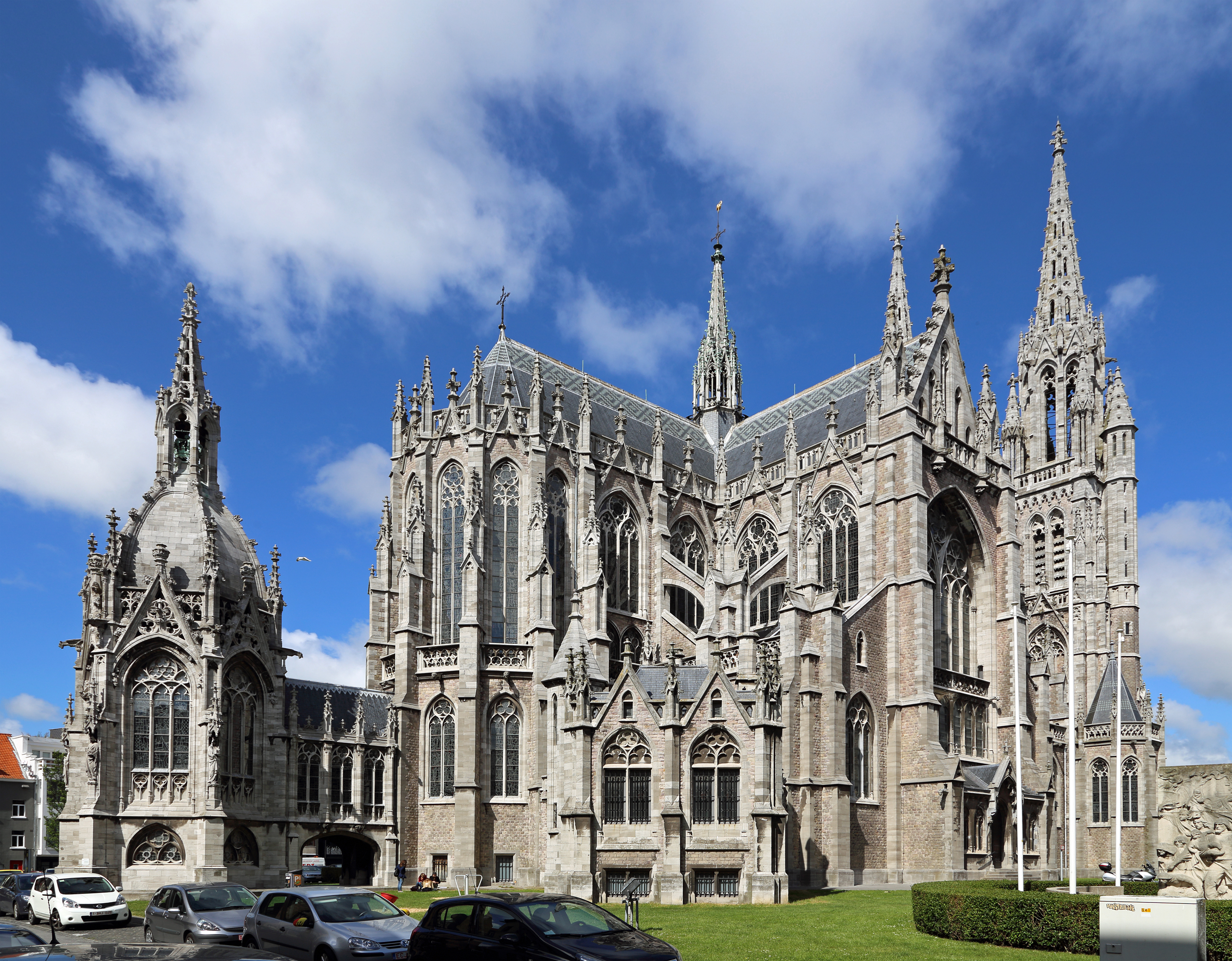
Sint-Petrus-en-Pauluskerk in Ostend (Belgium), built between 1899 and 1908

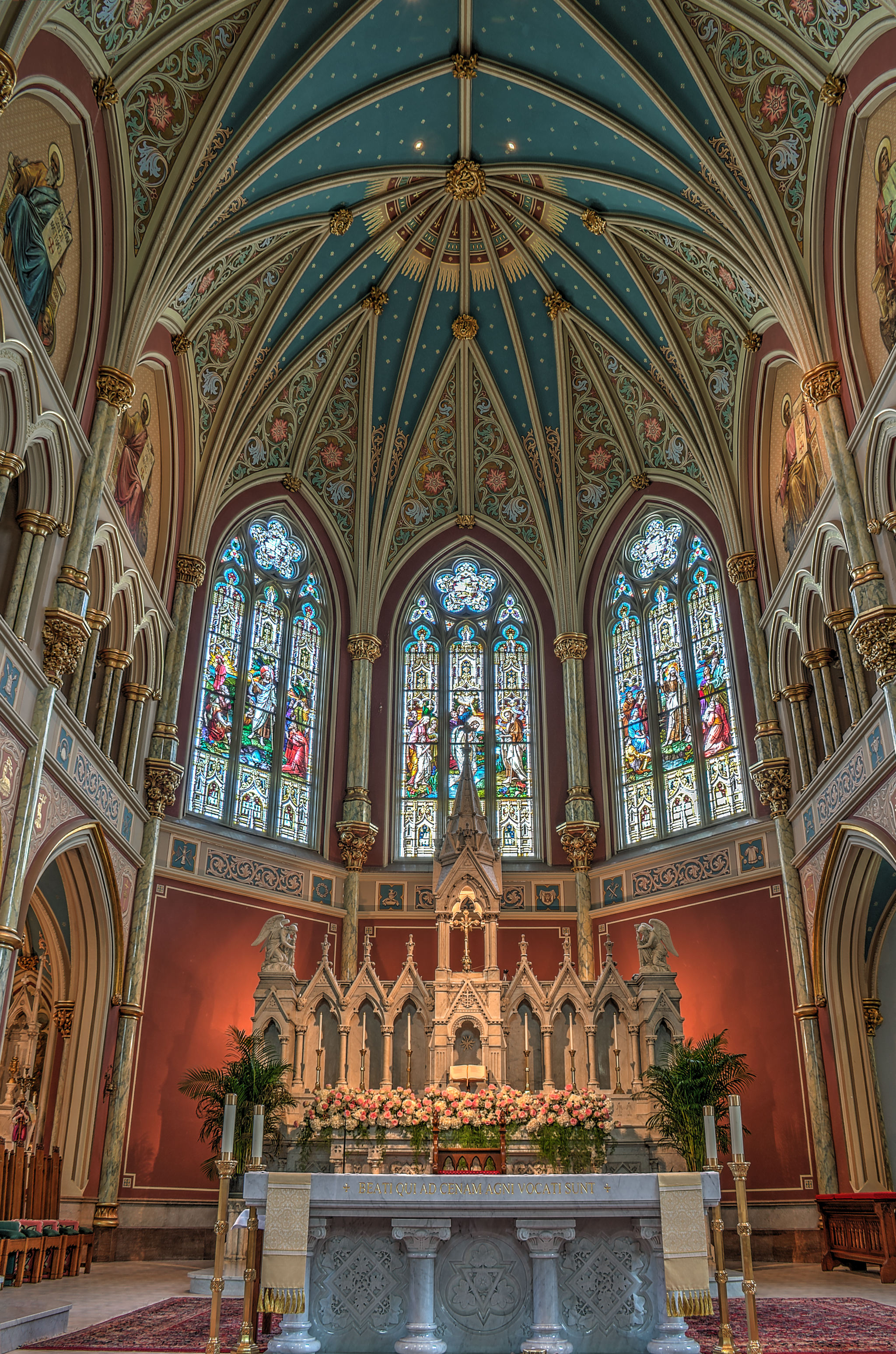
The Cathedral of St. John the Baptist, Savannah, Georgia, United States

Gothic Revival (also referred to as Victorian Gothic or Neo-Gothic) is an architectural movement that after a gradual build-up beginning in the second half of the 17th century became a widespread movement in the first half of the 19th century, mostly in England. Increasingly serious and learned admirers sought to revive medieval Gothic architecture, intending to complement or even supersede the neoclassical styles prevalent at the time. Gothic Revival draws upon features of medieval examples, including decorative patterns, finials, lancet windows, and hood moulds. By the middle of the 19th century, Gothic Revival had become the pre-eminent architectural style in the Western world, only to begin to fall out of fashion in the 1880s and early 1890s.

For some in England, the Gothic Revival movement had roots that were intertwined with philosophical movements associated with Catholicism and a re-awakening of high church or Anglo-Catholic belief concerned by the growth of religious nonconformism. The "Anglo-Catholic" tradition of religious belief and style became known for its intrinsic appeal in the third quarter of the 19th century. Gothic Revival architecture varied considerably in its faithfulness to both the ornamental styles and construction principles of its medieval ideal, sometimes amounting to little more than pointed window frames and touches of neo-Gothic decoration on buildings otherwise created on wholly 19th-century plans, using contemporary materials and construction methods; most notably, this involved the use of iron and, after the 1880s, steel in ways never seen in medieval exemplars.

In parallel with the ascendancy of neo-Gothic styles in 19th century England, interest spread to the rest of Europe, Australia, Asia and the Americas; the 19th and early 20th centuries saw the construction of very large numbers of Gothic Revival structures worldwide. The influence of Revivalism had nevertheless peaked by the 1870s. New architectural movements, sometimes related, as in the Arts and Crafts movement, and sometimes in outright opposition, such as Modernism, gained ground, and by the 1930s the architecture of the Victorian era was generally condemned or ignored. The later 20th century saw a revival of interest, manifested in the United Kingdom by the establishment of the Victorian Society in 1958.

== Roots ==
The rise of evangelicalism in the eighteenth and early nineteenth centuries saw in England a reaction in the high church movement which sought to emphasise the continuity between the established church and the pre-Reformation Catholic church. Architecture, in the form of the Gothic Revival, became one of the main weapons in the high church's armoury. The Gothic Revival was also paralleled and supported by "medievalism", which had its roots in antiquarian concerns with survivals and curiosities. As "industrialisation" progressed, a reaction against machine production and the appearance of factories also grew. Proponents of the picturesque such as Thomas Carlyle and Augustus Pugin took a critical view of industrial society and portrayed pre-industrial medieval society as a golden age. To Pugin, Gothic architecture was infused with the Christian values that had been supplanted by classicism and were being destroyed by industrialisation.

Gothic Revival also took on political connotations, with the "rational" and "radical" Neoclassical style being seen as associated with republicanism and liberalism (as evidenced by its use in the United States and to a lesser extent in Republican France). In contrast, the more spiritual and traditional Gothic Revival became associated with monarchism and conservatism, which was reflected by the choice of styles for the rebuilt government centres of the British Parliament's Palace of Westminster in London, the Canadian Parliament Buildings in Ottawa and the Hungarian Parliament Building in Budapest.

In English literature, the architectural Gothic Revival and classical Romanticism gave rise to the Gothic novel genre, beginning with The Castle of Otranto (1764) by Horace Walpole, and inspired a 19th-century genre of medieval poetry that stems from the pseudo-bardic poetry of "Ossian". Poems such as "Idylls of the King" by Alfred, Lord Tennyson recast specifically modern themes in medieval settings of Arthurian romance. In German literature, the Gothic Revival also had a grounding in literary fashions.

== Survival and revival ==
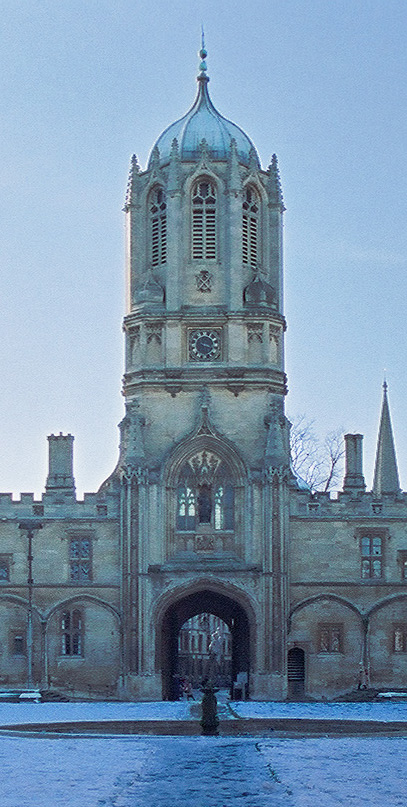
Tom Tower, Oxford, by Sir Christopher Wren 1681–1682, to match the Tudor surroundings

Gothic architecture began at the Basilica of Saint Denis near Paris, and the Cathedral of Sens in 1140 and ended with a last flourish in the early 16th century with buildings like Henry VII's Chapel at Westminster. However, Gothic architecture did not die out completely in the 16th century but instead lingered in on-going cathedral-building projects; at Oxford and Cambridge Universities, and in the construction of churches in increasingly isolated rural districts of England, France, Germany, the Polish–Lithuanian Commonwealth and in Spain.

=== Britain and Ireland ===
St Columb's Cathedral, in Derry, may be considered 'Gothic Survival', as it was completed in 1633 in a Perpendicular Gothic style. Similarly, Gothic architecture survived in some urban settings during the later 17th century, as shown in Oxford and Cambridge, where some additions and repairs to Gothic buildings were considered to be more in keeping with the style of the original structures than contemporary Baroque.

In contrast, Dromore Cathedral, built in 1660/1661, immediately after the end of the Protectorate, revived Early English forms, demonstrating the restitution of the monarchy and claiming Ireland for the English crown. At the same time, the Great Hall of Lambeth Palace, that had been despoiled by the Puritans, was rebuilt in a mixture of Baroque and older Gothic forms, demonstrating the restitution of the Anglican Church. These two buildings can be said to herald the onset of Gothic Revival architecture, several decades before it became mainstream. Sir Christopher Wren's Tom Tower for Christ Church, University of Oxford, consciously set out to imitate Cardinal Wolsey's architectural style. Writing to Dean Fell in 1681, he noted; "I resolved it ought to be Gothic to agree with the Founder's work", adding that to do otherwise would lead to "an unhandsome medley". Pevsner suggests that he succeeded "to the extent that innocent visitors never notice the difference". It was followed in 1697–1704 by the rebuilding of Collegiate Church of St Mary in Warwick as a stone-vaulted hall church, whereas the burnt church had been a basilica with timbered roofs. Also in Warwickshire, in 1729/30, the nave and aisles of the church of St Nicholas at Alcester were rebuilt by Edward and Thomas Woodward, the exterior in Gothic forms but with a Neoclassical interior. At the same time, 1722–1746, Nicholas Hawksmoor added the west towers to Westminster Abbey, which made him a pioneer of Gothic Revival completions of medieval buildings, which from the late 19th century were increasingly disapproved of, although work in this style continued into the 20th century. Back in Oxford, the redecoration of the dining hall at University College between 1766 and 1768 has been described as "the first major example of the Gothic Revival style in Oxford". (Note: The driver of the redecoration at University College was Sir Roger Newdigate, who also undertook the "Gothicisation" of his Warwickshire country house, Arbury Hall, over the course of 50 years in the later half of the 18th century.)

=== Continental Europe ===
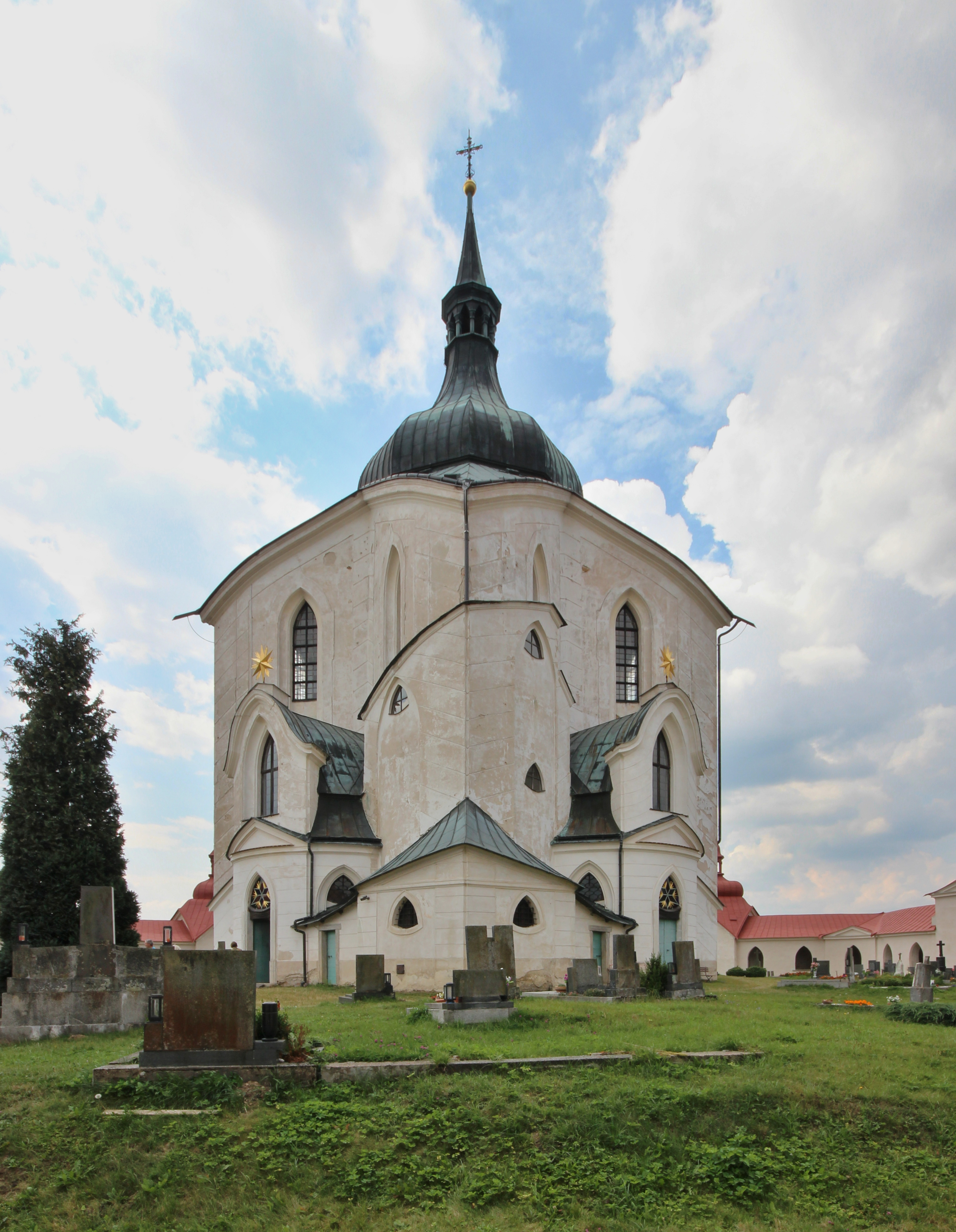
Pilgrimage Church of Saint John of Nepomuk by Johann Santini Aichel (around 1720), Czech Republic, historic Moravia

Throughout France in the 16th and 17th centuries, churches continued to be built following Gothic principles (structure of the buildings, application of tracery) such as St-Eustache (1532–1640, façade 1754) in Paris and Orléans Cathedral (1601–1829). This newer construction incorporated some little changes like the use of round arches instead of pointed arches and the application of some Classical details, until largely being replaced in new construction with the arrival of Baroque architecture.

In Bologna, in 1646, the Baroque architect Carlo Rainaldi constructed Gothic vaults (completed 1658) for the Basilica of San Petronio in Bologna, which had been under construction since 1390; there, the Gothic context of the structure overrode considerations of the current architectural mode. Similarly, in St. Salvator's Cathedral of Bruges, the timbered medieval vaults of nave and choir were replaced by "Gothic" stone vaults in 1635 resp. 1738/39. Guarino Guarini, a 17th-century Theatine monk active primarily in Turin, recognized the "Gothic order" as one of the primary systems of architecture and made use of it in his practice.

Even in Central Europe of the late 17th and 18th centuries, where Baroque dominated, some architects continued to use elements of the Gothic style. The most important example is Johann Santini Aichel, whose Pilgrimage Church of Saint John of Nepomuk in Žďár nad Sázavou, Czech Republic, represents a peculiar and creative synthesis of Baroque and Gothic. An example of another and less striking use of the Gothic style in the time is the Basilica of Our Lady of Hungary in Márianosztra, Hungary, whose choir (adjacent to a Baroque nave) was long considered authentically Gothic, because the 18th-century architect used medieval shapes to emphasize the continuity of the monastic community with its 14th-century founders.

=== Romantic challenges ===
During the mid-18th century rise of Romanticism, an increased interest and awareness of the Middle Ages among influential connoisseurs created a more appreciative approach to selected medieval arts, beginning with church architecture, the tomb monuments of royal and noble personages, stained glass, and late Gothic illuminated manuscripts. Other Gothic arts, such as tapestries and metalwork, continued to be disregarded as barbaric and crude, however sentimental and nationalist associations with historical figures were as strong in this early revival as purely aesthetic concerns.

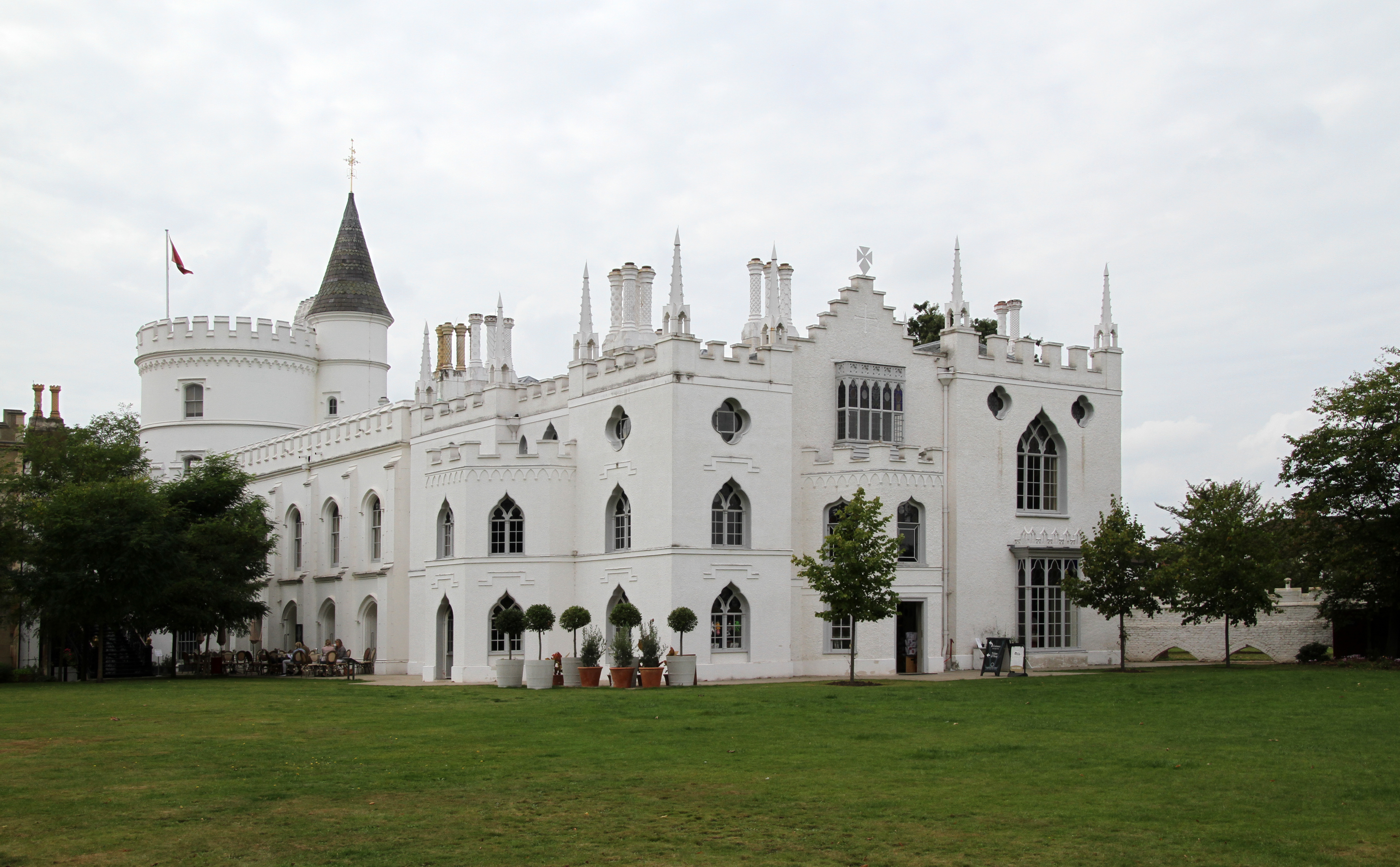
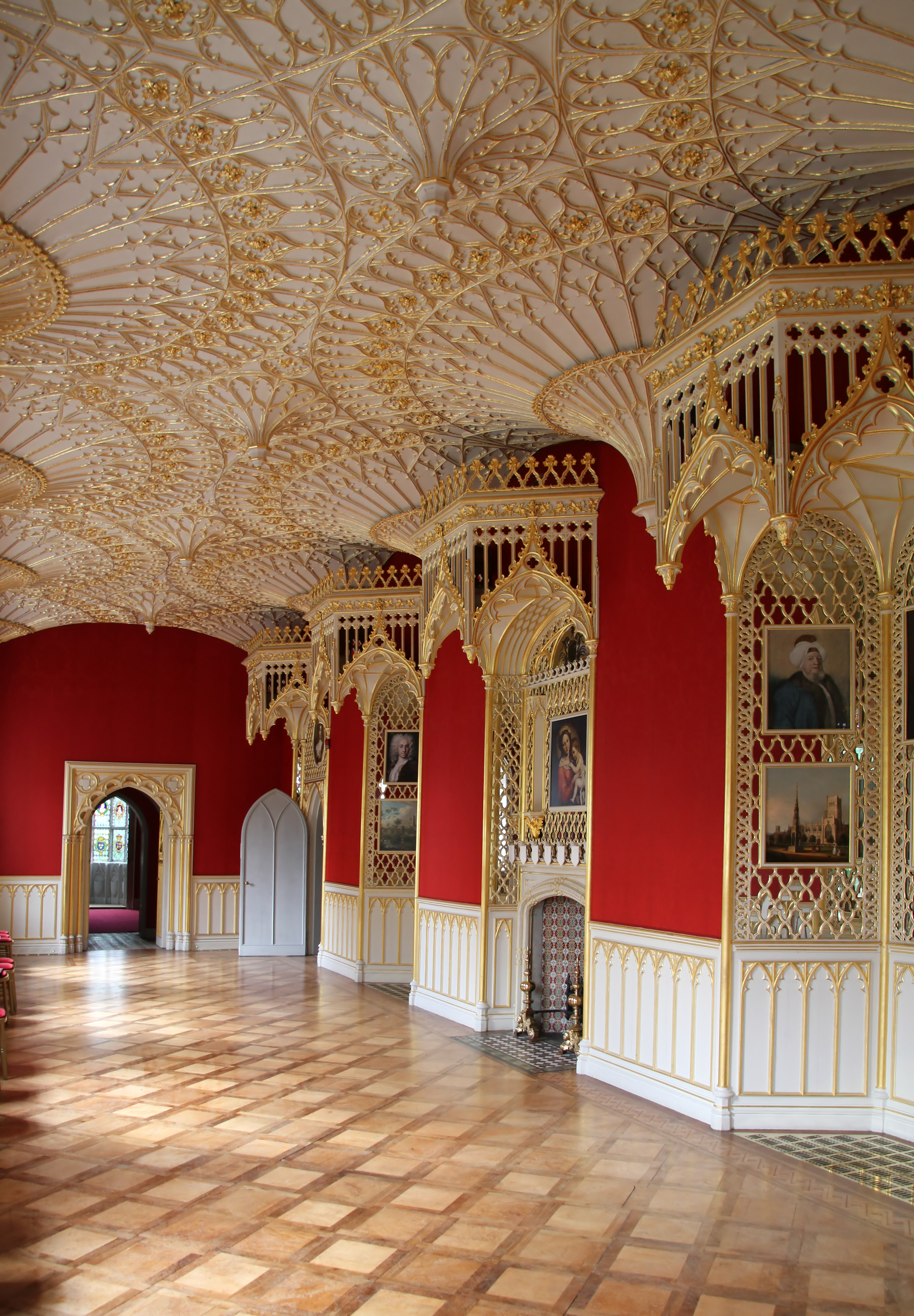
Strawberry Hill House, Twickenham, London; 1749 by Horace Walpole (1717–1797). "The seminal house of the Gothic Revival in England", it established the "Strawberry Hill Gothic" style

German Romanticists (including philosopher and writer Goethe and architect Karl Friedrich Schinkel), began to appreciate the picturesque character of ruins—"picturesque" becoming a new aesthetic quality—and those mellowing effects of time that the Japanese call wabi-sabi and that Horace Walpole independently admired, mildly tongue-in-cheek, as "the true rust of the Barons' wars". (Note: This was Walpole's appraisal of the sham castle at Hagley Park, Worcestershire designed by his friend, Sanderson Miller.) The "Gothick" details of Walpole's Twickenham villa, Strawberry Hill House begun in 1749, appealed to the rococo tastes of the time, (Note: Tours of the house, conducted by Walpole's housekeeper, Margaret Young, proved hugely popular. Walpole wrote to a friend; "I am so tormented by droves of people coming to see my house, and Margaret gets such sums of money by showing it, that I have a mind to marry her".) and were fairly quickly followed by James Talbot at Lacock Abbey, Wiltshire. By the 1770s, thoroughly neoclassical architects such as Robert Adam and James Wyatt were prepared to provide Gothic details in drawing-rooms, libraries and chapels and, for William Beckford at Fonthill in Wiltshire, a complete romantic vision of a Gothic abbey. (Note: Alfred's Hall, built by Lord Bathurst on his Cirencester Park estate between 1721 and 1732 in homage to Alfred the Great, is perhaps the earliest Gothic Revival structure in England.)

Some of the earliest architectural examples of the revived are found in Scotland. Inveraray Castle, constructed from 1746 for the Duke of Argyll, with design input from William Adam, displays the incorporation of turrets. (Note: The little-researched Clearwell Castle in Gloucestershire, by Roger Morris who also undertook work at Inveraray, has been described as "the earliest Gothick Revival castle in England".) The architectural historian John Gifford writes that the castellations were the "symbolic assertion of the still quasi-feudal power [the duke] exercised over the inhabitants within his heritable jurisdictions". Most buildings were still largely in the established Palladian style, but some houses incorporated external features of the Scots baronial style. Robert Adam's houses in this style include Mellerstain and Wedderburn in Berwickshire and Seton Castle in East Lothian, but it is most clearly seen at Culzean Castle, Ayrshire, remodelled by Adam from 1777. The eccentric landscape designer Batty Langley even attempted to "improve" Gothic forms by giving them classical proportions.

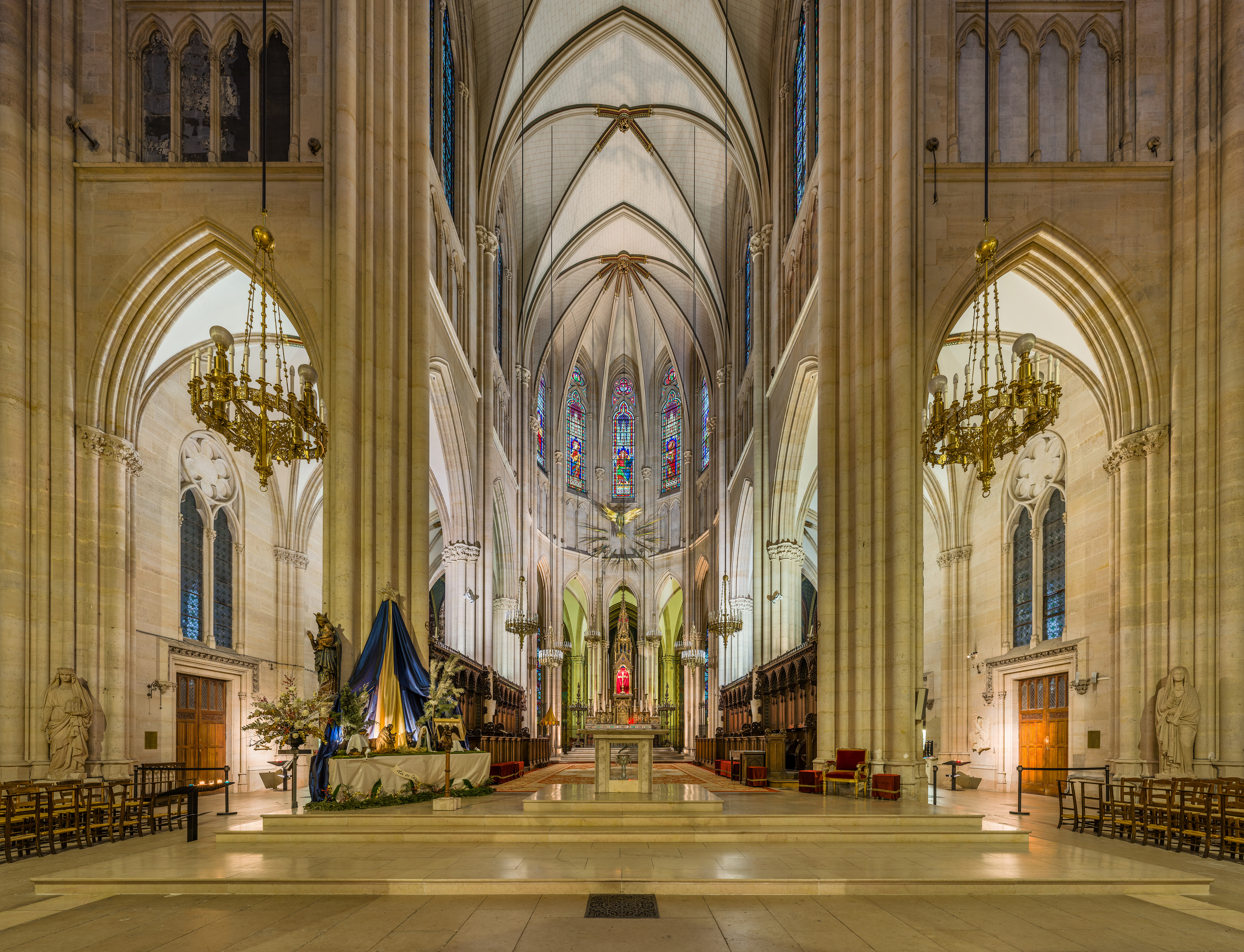
Basilica of Sainte Clotilde Sanctuary, Paris, France

A younger generation, taking Gothic architecture more seriously, provided the readership for John Britton's series Architectural Antiquities of Great Britain, which began appearing in 1807. In 1817, Thomas Rickman wrote an Attempt... to name and define the sequence of Gothic styles in English ecclesiastical architecture, "a text-book for the architectural student". Its long antique title is descriptive: Attempt to discriminate the styles of English architecture from the Conquest to the Reformation; preceded by a sketch of the Grecian and Roman orders, with notices of nearly five hundred English buildings. The categories he used were Norman, Early English, Decorated, and Perpendicular. It went through numerous editions, was still being republished by 1881, and has been reissued in the 21st century. (Note: Thomas Rickman trained as an accountant and his posthumous famed rested on his antiquarian researches, rather than his considerable corpus of buildings, which were disparaged as the creations of a "self-taught" architect. It was only towards the end of his life, and after, that the position of architect was recognised as a profession, with the establishment of the Institute of British Architects in 1834 and the Architectural Association in 1847.)

The most common use for Gothic Revival architecture was in the building of churches. Major examples of Gothic cathedrals in the U.S. include the cathedrals of St. John the Divine and St. Patrick in New York City and the Washington National Cathedral on Mount St. Alban in northwest Washington, D.C. One of the biggest churches in Gothic Revival style in Canada is the Basilica of Our Lady Immaculate in Guelph, Ontario.

Gothic Revival architecture remained one of the most popular and long-lived of the many revival styles of architecture. Although it began to lose force and popularity after the third quarter of the 19th century in commercial, residential and industrial fields, some buildings such as churches, schools, colleges and universities were still constructed in the Gothic style, often known as "Collegiate Gothic", which remained popular in England, Canada and in the United States until well into the early to mid-20th century. Only when new materials, like steel and glass along with concern for function in everyday working life and saving space in the cities, meaning the need to build up instead of out, began to take hold did the Gothic Revival start to disappear from popular building requests.

== Gothic Revival in the other decorative arts ==
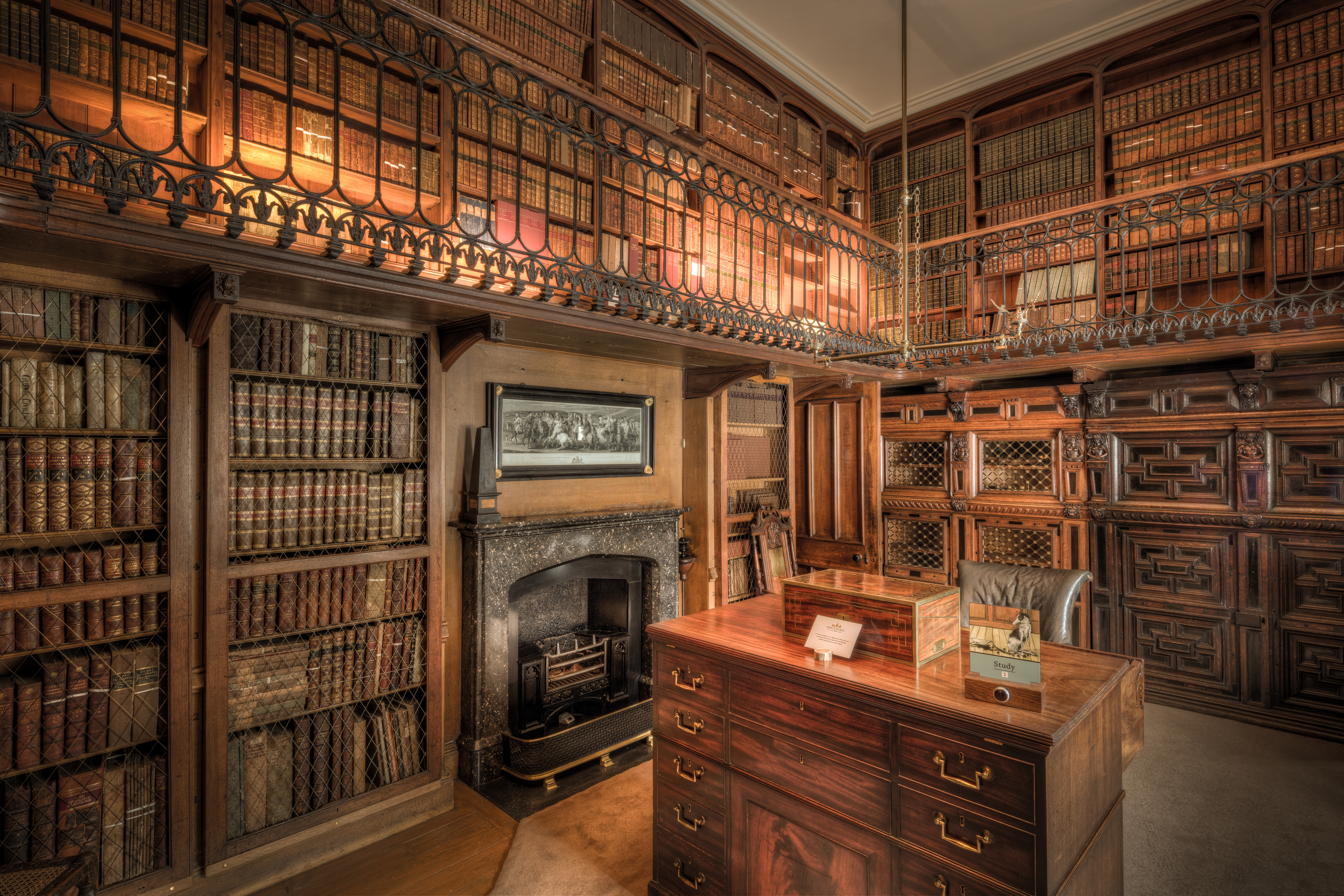
The study at Abbotsford, created for Sir Walter Scott, whose novels popularised the Medieval period from which the Gothic Revival drew its inspiration

The revived Gothic style was not limited to architecture. Classical Gothic buildings of the 12th to 16th Centuries were a source of inspiration to 19th-century designers in numerous fields of work. Architectural elements such as pointed arches, steep-sloping roofs and fancy carvings like lace and lattice work were applied to a wide range of Gothic Revival objects. Some examples of Gothic Revival influence can be found in heraldic motifs in coats of arms, furniture with elaborate painted scenes like the whimsical Gothic detailing in English furniture is traceable as far back as Lady Pomfret's house in Arlington Street, London (1740s), and Gothic fretwork in chairbacks and glazing patterns of bookcases is a familiar feature of Chippendale's Director (1754, 1762), where, for example, the three-part bookcase employs Gothic details with Rococo profusion, on a symmetrical form. Abbotsford in the Scottish Borders, rebuilt from 1816 by Sir Walter Scott and paid for by the profits from his hugely successful, historical novels, exemplifies the "Regency Gothic" style. (Note: Sir Walter Scott's novels popularised the Medieval period and their influence went well beyond architecture. The historian Robert Bartlett notes that, at one point in the mid-19th century, four different stage adaptations of Ivanhoe were running simultaneously in London theatres, and nine separate operas were based on the work.) Gothic Revival also includes the reintroduction of medieval clothes and dances in historical re-enactments staged especially in the second part of the 19th century, although one of the first, the Eglinton Tournament of 1839, remains the most famous.

During the Bourbon Restoration in France (1814–1830) and the Louis-Philippe period (1830–1848), Gothic Revival motifs start to appear, together with revivals of the Renaissance and of Rococo. During these two periods, the vogue for medieval things led craftsmen to adopt Gothic decorative motifs in their work, such as bell turrets, lancet arches, trefoils, Gothic tracery and rose windows. This style was also known as "Cathedral style" ("À la catédrale").

By the mid-19th century, Gothic traceries and niches could be inexpensively re-created in wallpaper, and Gothic blind arcading could decorate a ceramic pitcher. Writing in 1857, J. G. Crace, an influential decorator from a family of influential interior designers, expressed his preference for the Gothic style: "In my opinion there is no quality of lightness, elegance, richness or beauty possessed by any other style... [or] in which the principles of sound construction can be so well carried out". The illustrated catalogue for the Great Exhibition of 1851 is replete with Gothic detail, from lacemaking and carpet designs to heavy machinery. Nikolaus Pevsner's volume on the exhibits at the Great Exhibition, High Victorian Design published in 1951, was an important contribution to the academic study of Victorian taste and an early indicator of the later 20th century rehabilitation of Victorian architecture and the objects with which they decorated their buildings.

In 1847, eight thousand British crown coins were minted in proof condition with the design using an ornate reverse in keeping with the revived style. Considered by collectors to be particularly beautiful, they are known as 'Gothic crowns'. The design was repeated in 1853, again in proof. A similar two shilling coin, the 'Gothic florin' was minted for circulation from 1851 to 1887.

== Romanticism and nationalism ==
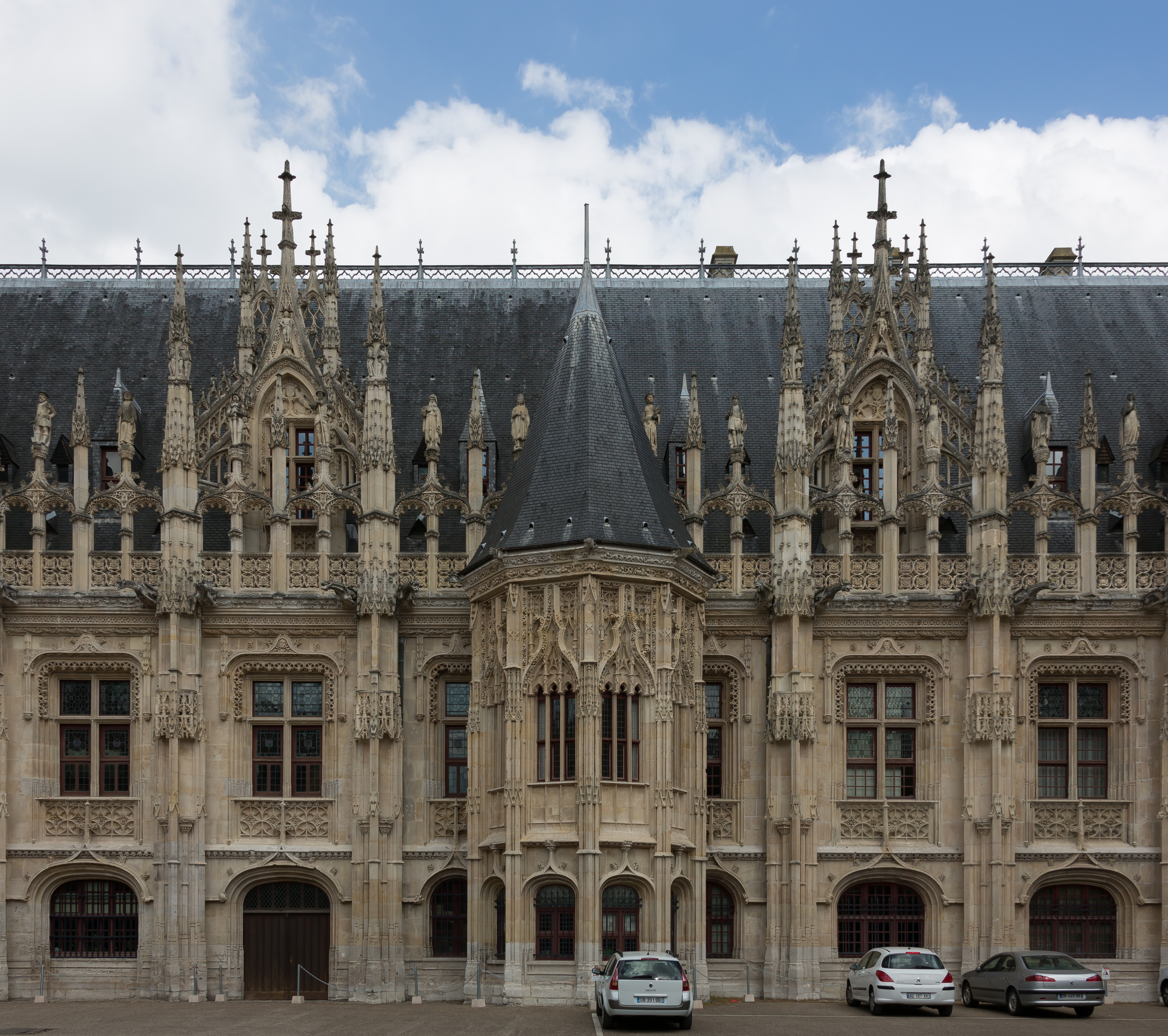
Gothic façade of the Parlement de Rouen in France, built between 1499 and 1508, which inspired neo-Gothic revival in the 19th century

French neo-Gothic had its roots in the French medieval Gothic architecture, where it was created in the 12th century. Gothic architecture was sometimes known during the medieval period as the "Opus Francigenum", (the "French Art"). French scholar Alexandre de Laborde wrote in 1816 that "Gothic architecture has beauties of its own", which marked the beginning of the Gothic Revival in France. Starting in 1828, Alexandre Brogniart, the director of the Sèvres porcelain manufactory, produced fired enamel paintings on large panes of plate glass, for King Louis-Philippe's Chapelle royale de Dreux, an important early French commission in Gothic taste, preceded mainly by some Gothic features in a few jardins paysagers.

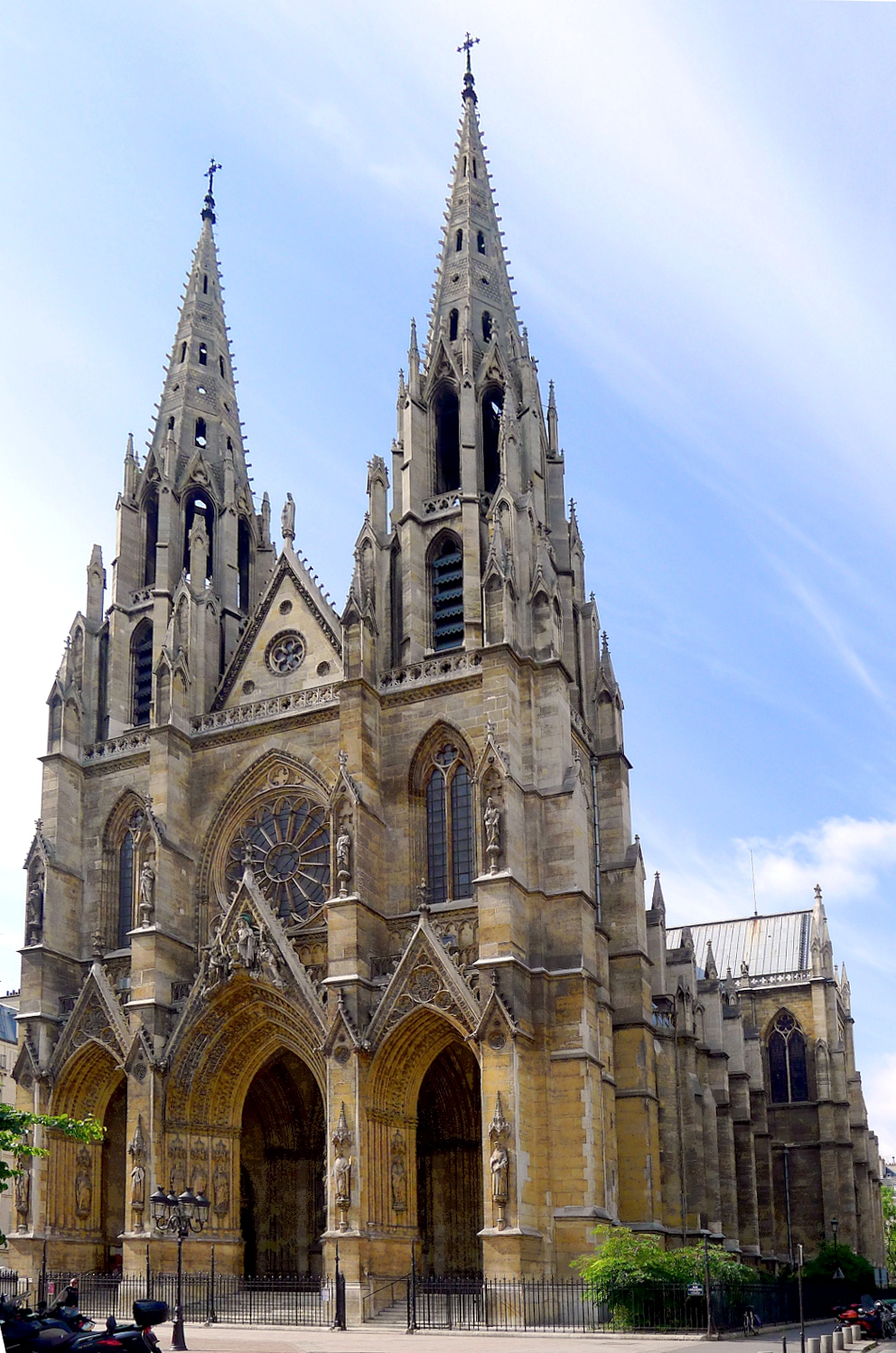
Sainte-Clotilde Basilica completed in 1857, Paris

The French Gothic Revival was set on more sound intellectual footings by a pioneer, Arcisse de Caumont, who founded the Societé des Antiquaires de Normandie at a time when antiquaire still meant a connoisseur of antiquities, and who published his great work on architecture in French Normandy in 1830. The following year Victor Hugo's historical romance novel The Hunchback of Notre-Dame appeared, in which the great Gothic cathedral of Paris was at once a setting and a protagonist in a hugely popular work of fiction. Hugo intended his book to awaken a concern for the surviving Gothic architecture left in Europe, however, rather than to initiate a craze for neo-Gothic in contemporary life. In the same year that Notre-Dame de Paris appeared, the new restored Bourbon monarchy established an office in the Royal French Government of Inspector-General of Ancient Monuments, a post which was filled in 1833 by Prosper Mérimée, who became the secretary of a new Commission des Monuments Historiques in 1837. This was the Commission that instructed Eugène Viollet-le-Duc to report on the condition of the Abbey of Vézelay in 1840. Following this, Viollet le Duc set out to restore most of the symbolic buildings in France including Notre Dame de Paris, Vézelay, Carcassonne, Roquetaillade castle, Mont-Saint-Michel Abbey on its peaked coastal island, Pierrefonds, and the Palais des Papes in Avignon. When France's first prominent neo-Gothic church (Note: In Montreal, Quebec, Canada, the earlier neo-Gothic Basilica of Notre Dame (1824) belongs to the Gothic Revival exported from Great Britain and the United States. Its architect, James O'Donnell, was an Irish immigrant with no known connections to France.) was built, the Basilica of Saint-Clotilde, (Note: The choice of the canonized wife of King Clovis, the first Christian king of a unified France, held significance for the Bourbons.) Paris, begun in 1846 and consecrated in 1857, the architect chosen was of German extraction, Franz Christian Gau, (1790–1853); the design was significantly modified by Gau's assistant, Théodore Ballu, in the later stages, to produce the pair of flèches that crown the west end.

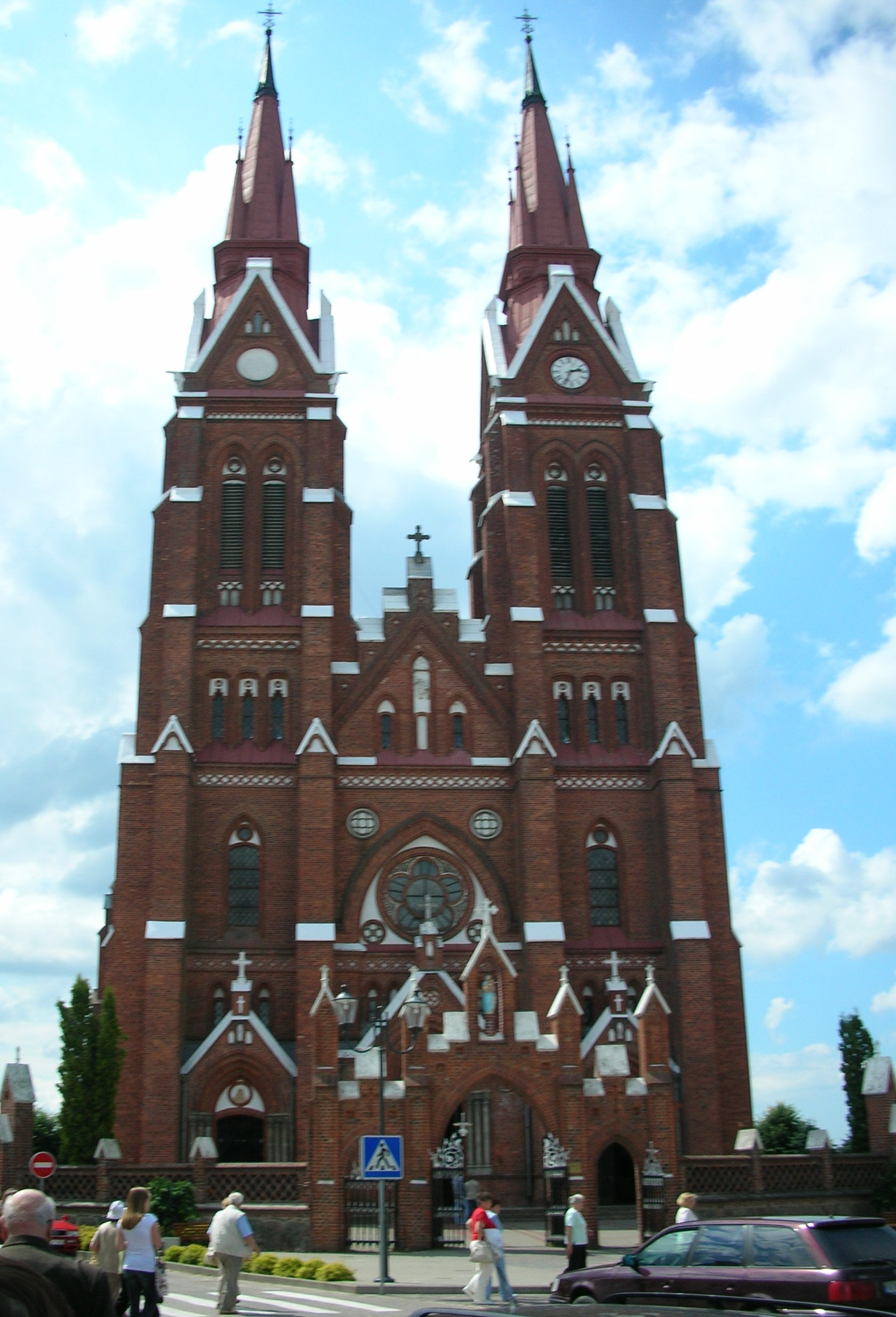
The lifting of a ban on the construction of new Catholic churches around 1900 saw a resurgence of church building across Lithuania, such as St John the Apostle in Švėkšna.

In Germany, there was a renewal of interest in the completion of Cologne Cathedral. Begun in 1248, it was still unfinished at the time of the revival. The 1820s "Romantic" movement brought a new appreciation of the building, and construction work began once more in 1842, marking a German return for Gothic architecture. St. Vitus Cathedral in Prague, begun in 1344, was also completed in the mid-19th and early 20th centuries. The importance of the Cologne completion project in German-speaking lands has been explored by Michael J. Lewis, "The Politics of the German Gothic Revival: August Reichensperger". Reichensperger was himself in no doubt as to the cathedral's central position in Germanic culture; "Cologne Cathedral is German to the core, it is a national monument in the fullest sense of the word, and probably the most splendid monument to be handed down to us from the past".

Because of Romantic nationalism in the early 19th century, the Germans, French and English all claimed the original Gothic architecture of the 12th century era as originating in their own country. The English boldly coined the term "Early English" for "Gothic", a term that implied Gothic architecture was an English creation. In his 1832 edition of Notre Dame de Paris, author Victor Hugo said "Let us inspire in the nation, if it is possible, love for the national architecture", implying that "Gothic" is France's national heritage. In Germany, with the completion of Cologne Cathedral in the 1880s, at the time its summit was the world's tallest building, the cathedral was seen as the height of Gothic architecture. Other major completions of Gothic cathedrals were of Regensburger Dom (with twin spires completed from 1869 to 1872), Ulm Münster (with a 161-meter tower from 1890) and St. Vitus Cathedral in Prague (1844–1929).

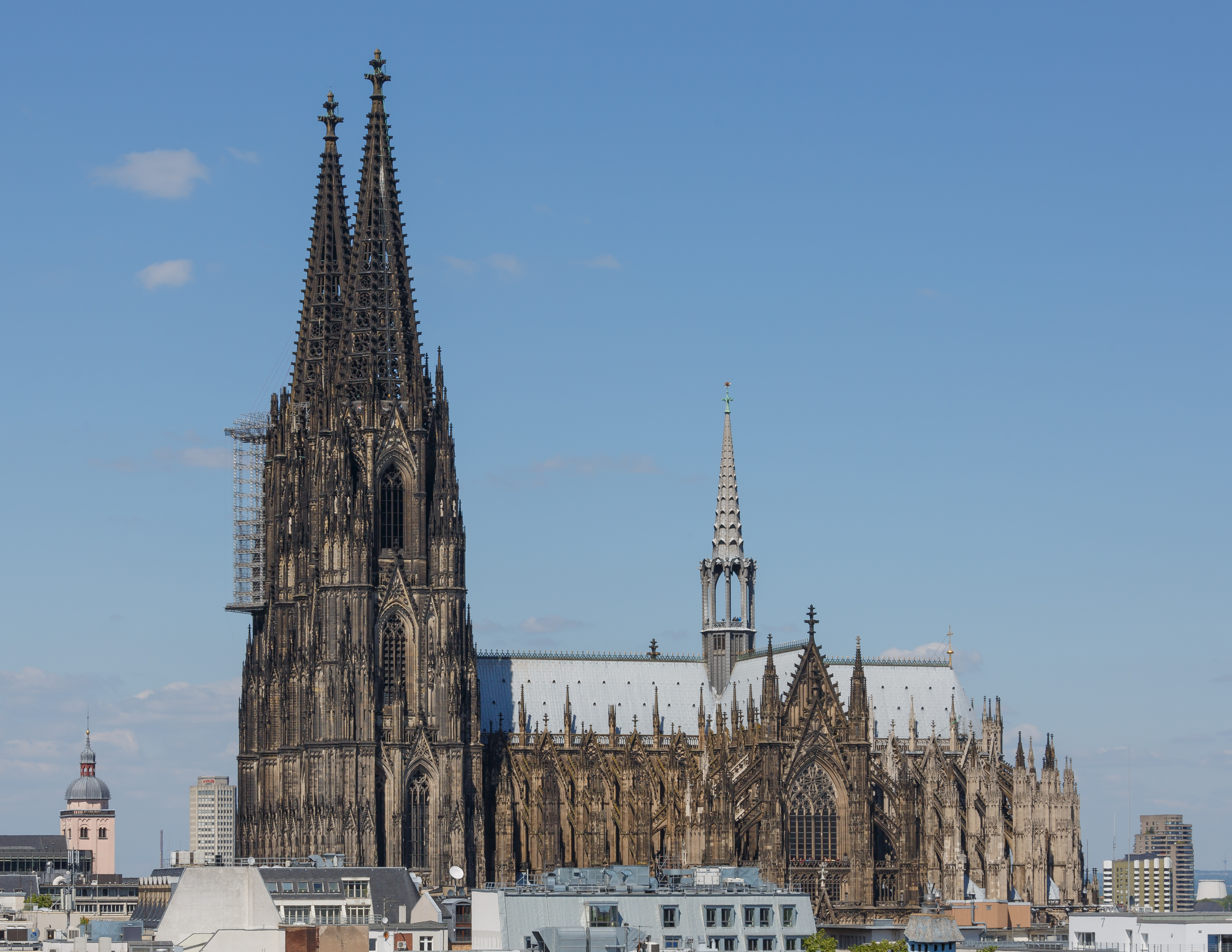
Cologne Cathedral, finally completed in 1880 although construction began in 1248

In Belgium, a 15th-century church in Ostend burned down in 1896. King Leopold II funded its replacement, the Saint Peter's and Saint Paul's Church, a cathedral-scale design which drew inspiration from the neo-Gothic Votive Church in Vienna and Cologne Cathedral. In Mechelen, the largely unfinished building drawn in 1526 as the seat of the Great Council of The Netherlands, was not actually built until the early 20th century, although it closely followed Rombout II Keldermans's Brabantine Gothic design, and became the 'new' north wing of the City Hall. In Florence, the Duomo's temporary façade erected for the Medici-House of Lorraine nuptials in 1588–1589, was dismantled, and the west end of the cathedral stood bare again until 1864, when a competition was held to design a new façade suitable to Arnolfo di Cambio's original structure and the fine campanile next to it. This competition was won by Emilio De Fabris, and so work on his polychrome design and panels of mosaic was begun in 1876 and completed by 1887, creating the Neo-Gothic western façade.

Eastern Europe also saw much Revival construction; in addition to the Hungarian Parliament Building in Budapest, the Bulgarian National Revival saw the introduction of Gothic Revival elements into its vernacular ecclesiastical and residential architecture. The largest project of the Slavine School is the Lopushna Monastery cathedral (1850–1853), though later churches such as Saint George's Church, Gavril Genovo display more prominent vernacular Gothic Revival features.

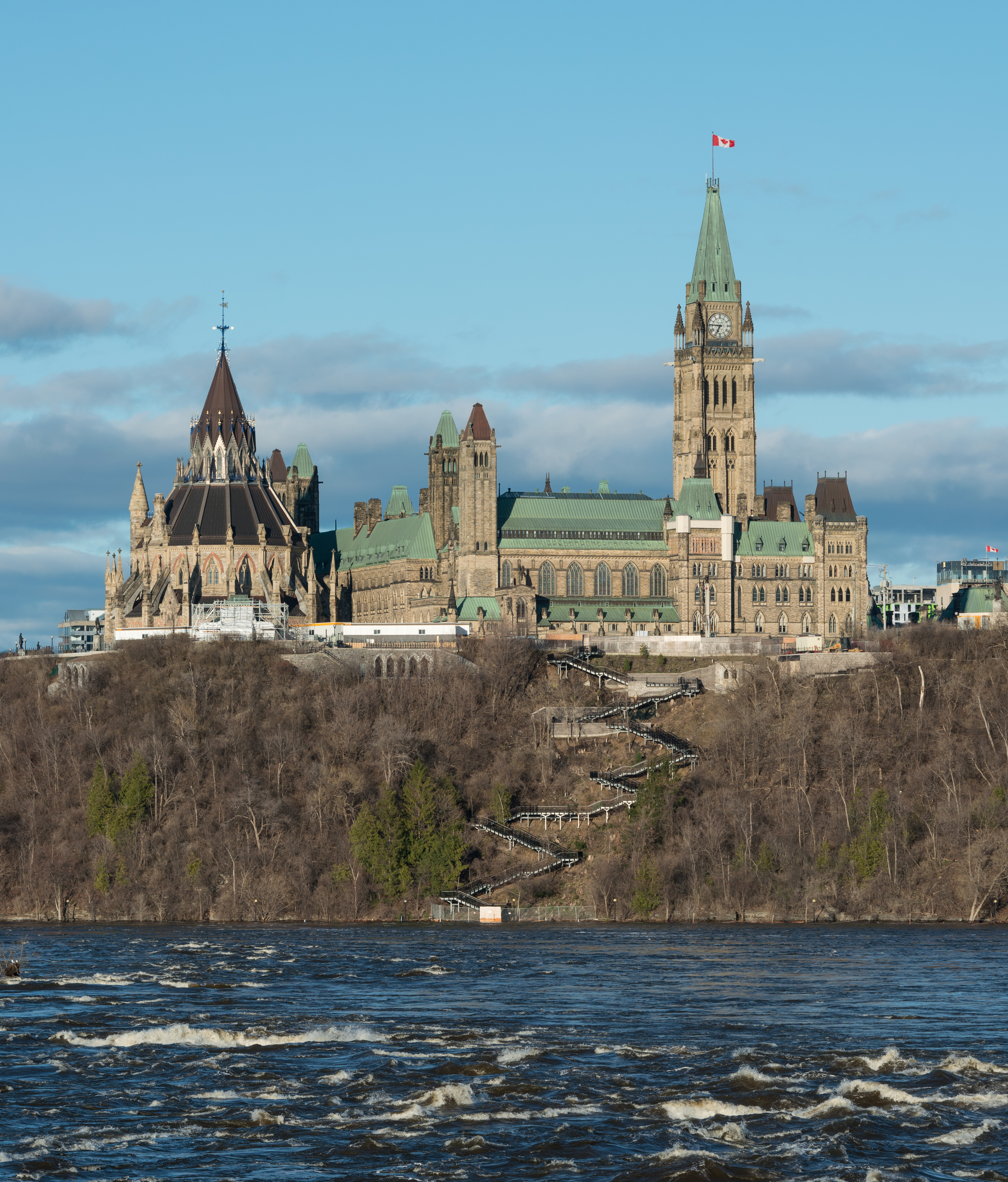
The Canadian Parliament Buildings from the Ottawa River, including Gothic Revival library at rear, built between 1859 and 1876

In Scotland, while a similar Gothic style to that used further south in England was adopted by figures including Frederick Thomas Pilkington (1832–1898) in secular architecture it was marked by the re-adoption of the Scots baronial style. Important for the adoption of the style in the early 19th century was Abbotsford, which became a model for the modern revival of the baronial style. Common features borrowed from 16th- and 17th-century houses included battlemented gateways, crow-stepped gables, pointed turrets and machicolations. The style was popular across Scotland and was applied to many relatively modest dwellings by architects such as William Burn (1789–1870), David Bryce (1803–1876), Edward Blore (1787–1879), Edward Calvert (c. 1847–1914) and Robert Stodart Lorimer (1864–1929) and in urban contexts, including the building of Cockburn Street in Edinburgh (from the 1850s) as well as the National Wallace Monument at Stirling (1859–1869). The reconstruction of Balmoral Castle as a baronial palace and its adoption as a royal retreat from 1855 to 1858 confirmed the popularity of the style.

In the United States, the first "Gothic stile" church (as opposed to churches with Gothic elements) was Trinity Church on the Green, New Haven, Connecticut. It was designed by Ithiel Town between 1812 and 1814, while he was building his Federalist-style Center Church, New Haven next to this radical new "Gothic-style" church. Its cornerstone was laid in 1814, and it was consecrated in 1816. It predates St Luke's Church, Chelsea, often said to be the first Gothic-revival church in London. Though built of trap rock stone with arched windows and doors, parts of its tower and its battlements were wood. Gothic buildings were subsequently erected by Episcopal congregations in Connecticut at St John's in Salisbury (1823), St John's in Kent (1823–1826) and St Andrew's in Marble Dale (1821–1823). These were followed by Town's design for Christ Church Cathedral (Hartford, Connecticut) (1827), which incorporated Gothic elements such as buttresses into the fabric of the church. St. Paul's Episcopal Church in Troy, New York, was constructed in 1827–1828 as an exact copy of Town's design for Trinity Church, New Haven, but using local stone; due to changes in the original, St. Paul's is closer to Town's original design than Trinity itself. In the 1830s, architects began to copy specific English Gothic and Gothic Revival Churches, and these "'mature Gothic Revival' buildings made the domestic Gothic style architecture which preceded it seem primitive and old-fashioned".

There are many examples of Gothic Revival architecture in Canada. The first major structure was Notre-Dame Basilica in Montreal, Quebec, which was designed in 1824. The capital, Ottawa, Ontario, was predominantly a 19th-century creation in the Gothic Revival style. The Parliament Hill buildings were the preeminent example, of which the original library survives today (after the rest was destroyed by fire in 1916). Their example was followed elsewhere in the city and outlying areas, showing how popular the Gothic Revival movement had become. Other examples of Canadian Gothic Revival architecture in Ottawa are the Victoria Memorial Museum, (1905–1908), the Royal Canadian Mint, (1905–1908), and the Connaught Building, (1913–1916), all by David Ewart.

== Gothic as a moral force ==
=== Pugin and "truth" in architecture ===
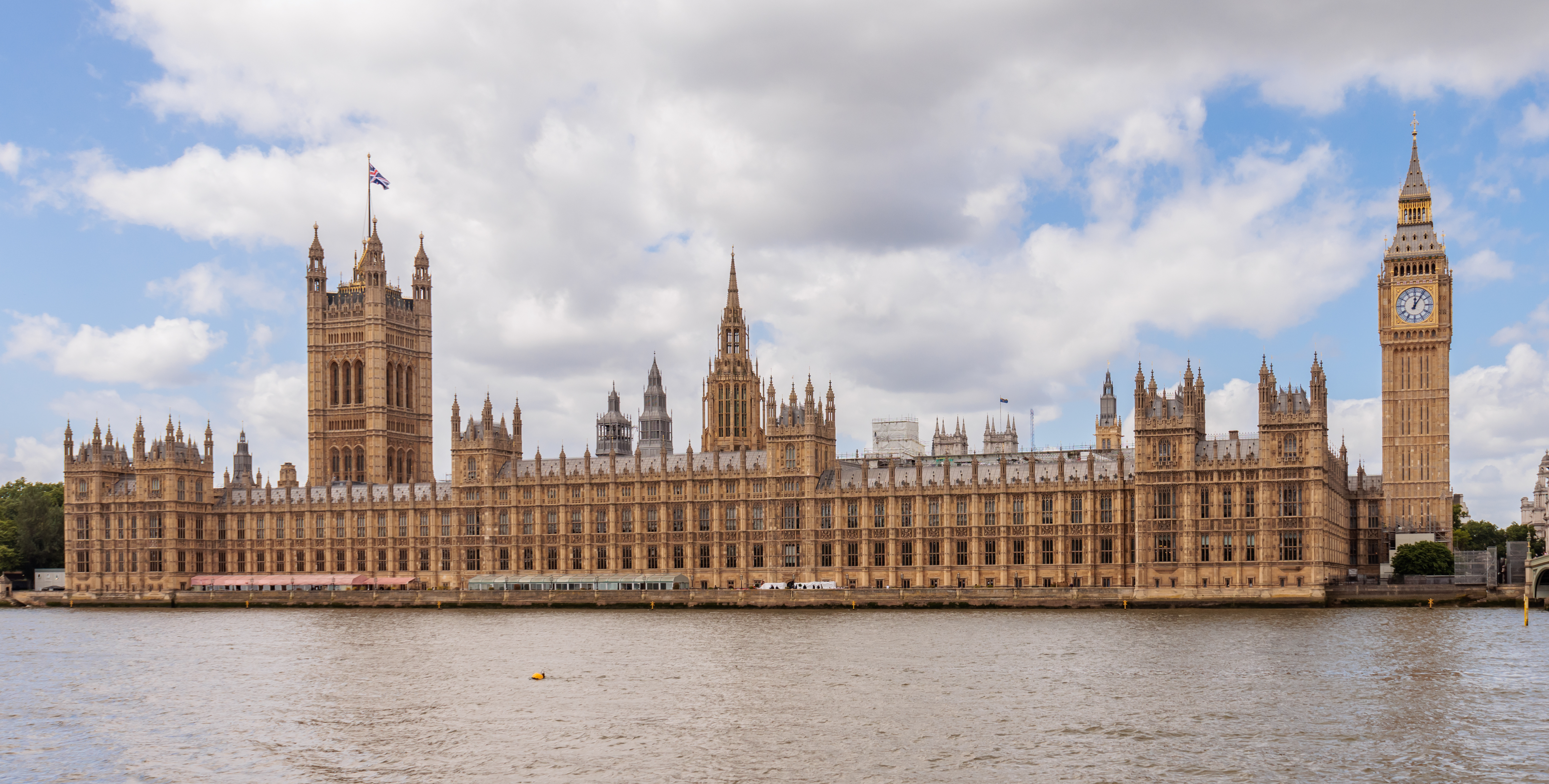
The Palace of Westminster (1840–1876), designed by Charles Barry & Augustus Pugin

In the late 1820s, A. W. N. Pugin, still a teenager, was working for two highly visible employers, providing Gothic detailing for luxury goods. For the Royal furniture makers Morel and Seddon he provided designs for redecorations for the elderly George IV at Windsor Castle in a Gothic taste suited to the setting. (Note: Pugin subsequently recanted, writing in the second of his two lectures, The True Principles of Pointed or Christian Architecture; "A man who remains any length of time in a modern Gothic room, and escapes without being wounded by some of its minutiae, may consider himself extremely fortunate. There are often as many pinnacles and gables about a pier glass frame as are to be found in a church. I have perpetrated many of these enormities in the furniture I designed some years ago for Windsor Castle... Collectively they appeared a complete burlesque of pointed design".) For the royal silversmiths Rundell Bridge and Co., Pugin provided designs for silver from 1828, using the 14th-century Anglo-French Gothic vocabulary that he would continue to favour later in designs for the new Palace of Westminster. Between 1821 and 1838 Pugin and his father published a series of volumes of architectural drawings, the first two entitled, Specimens of Gothic Architecture, and the following three, Examples of Gothic Architecture, that were to remain both in print and the standard references for Gothic Revivalists for at least the next century.

In Contrasts: or, a Parallel between the Noble Edifices of the Middle Ages, and similar Buildings of the Present Day (1836), Pugin expressed his admiration not only for medieval art but for the whole medieval ethos, suggesting that Gothic architecture was the product of a purer society. In The True Principles of Pointed or Christian Architecture (1841), he set out his "two great rules of design: 1st, that there should be no features about a building which are not necessary for convenience, construction or propriety; 2nd, that all ornament should consist of enrichment of the essential construction of the building". Urging modern craftsmen to seek to emulate the style of medieval workmanship as well as reproduce its methods, Pugin sought to reinstate Gothic as the true Christian architectural style.

Pugin's most notable project was the Houses of Parliament in London, after its predecessor was largely destroyed in a fire in 1834. (Note: Pugin recorded his delight at the destruction of what he considered the wholly inadequate earlier restorations of James Wyatt and John Soane. "You have doubtless seen the accounts of the late great conflagration at Westminster. There is nothing much to regret...a vast amount of Soane's mixtures and Wyatt's heresies have been consigned to oblivion. Oh it was a glorious sight to see his composition mullions and cement pinnacles flying and cracking.") His part in the design consisted of two campaigns, 1836–1837 and again in 1844 and 1852, with the classicist Charles Barry as his nominal superior. Pugin provided the external decoration and the interiors, while Barry designed the symmetrical layout of the building, causing Pugin to remark, "All Grecian, Sir; Tudor details on a classic body".

=== Ruskin and Venetian Gothic ===
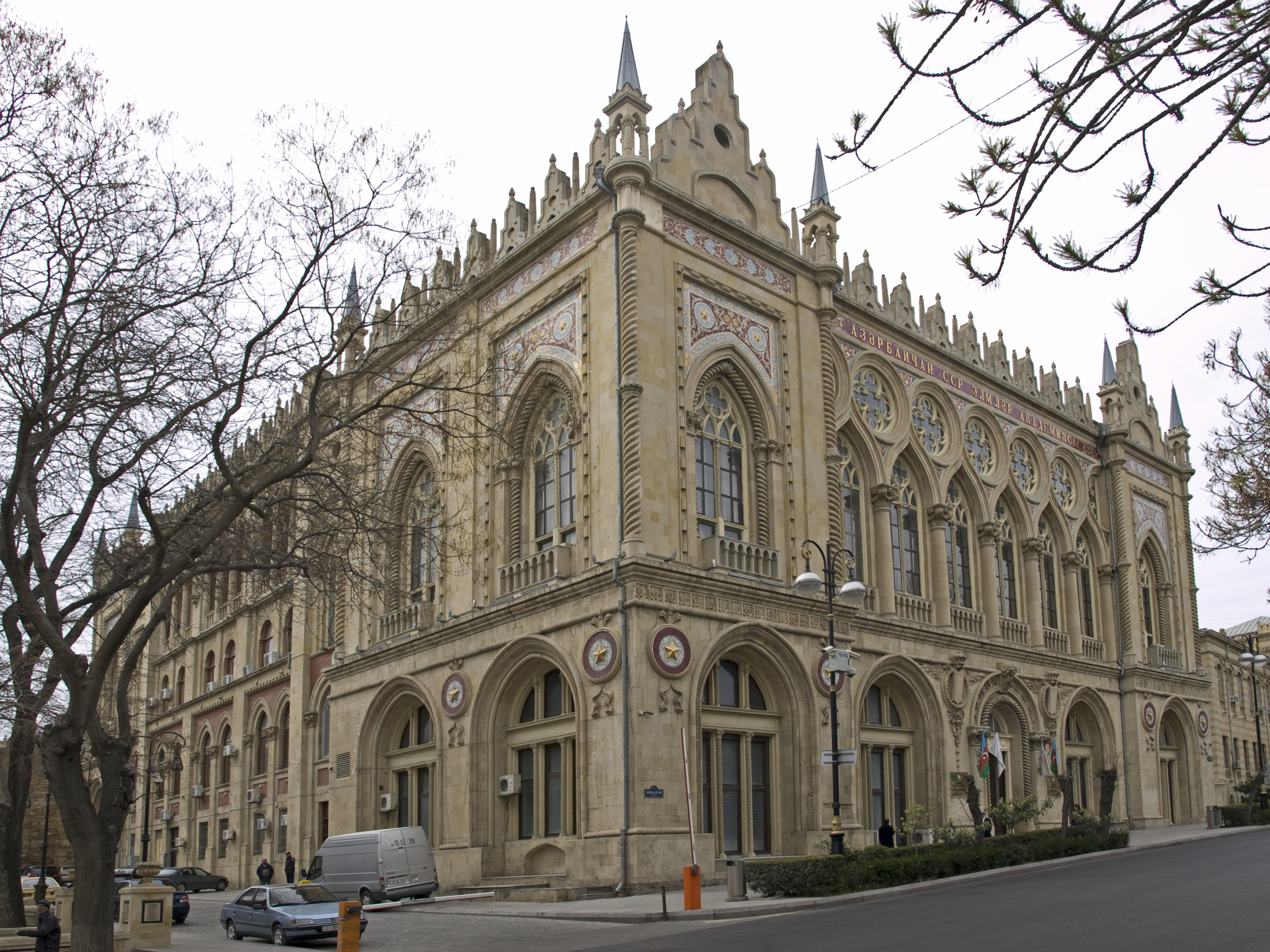
Venetian Gothic in Baku, Azerbaijan

John Ruskin supplemented Pugin's ideas in his two influential theoretical works, The Seven Lamps of Architecture (1849) and The Stones of Venice (1853). Finding his architectural ideal in Venice, Ruskin proposed that Gothic buildings excelled above all other architecture because of the "sacrifice" of the stone-carvers in intricately decorating every stone. In this, he drew a contrast between the physical and spiritual satisfaction which a medieval craftsman derived from his work, and the lack of these satisfactions afforded to modern, industrialised labour. (Note: Ruskin also had an abhorrence of the contemporary "restorer" of Gothic buildings. Writing in the Preface to the first edition of his The Seven Lamps of Architecture, he remarked; "[My] whole time has been lately occupied in taking drawings from the one side of buildings, of which masons were knocking down the other".)

By declaring the Doge's Palace to be "the central building of the world", Ruskin argued the case for Gothic government buildings as Pugin had done for churches, though mostly only in theory. When his ideas were put into practice, Ruskin often disliked the result, although he supported many architects, such as Thomas Newenham Deane and Benjamin Woodward, and was reputed to have designed some of the corbel decorations for that pair's Oxford University Museum of Natural History. A major clash between the Gothic and Classical styles in relation to governmental offices occurred less than a decade after the publication of The Stones of Venice. A public competition for the construction of a new Foreign Office in Whitehall saw the decision to award first place to a Gothic design by George Gilbert Scott overturned by the Prime Minister, Lord Palmerston, who successfully demanded a building in the Italianate style. (Note: The rumour that Scott repurposed his Foreign Office design for the Midland Grand Hotel is unfounded.)

=== Ecclesiology and funerary style ===
In England, the Church of England was undergoing a revival of Anglo-Catholic and ritualist ideology in the form of the Oxford Movement, and it became desirable to build large numbers of new churches to cater for the growing population, and cemeteries for their hygienic burials. This found ready exponents in the universities, where the ecclesiological movement was forming. Its proponents believed that Gothic was the only style appropriate for a parish church, and favoured a particular era of Gothic architecture – the "decorated". The Cambridge Camden Society, through its journal The Ecclesiologist, was so savagely critical of new church buildings that were below its exacting standards and its pronouncements were followed so avidly that it became the epicentre of the flood of Victorian restoration that affected most of the Anglican cathedrals and parish churches in England and Wales.

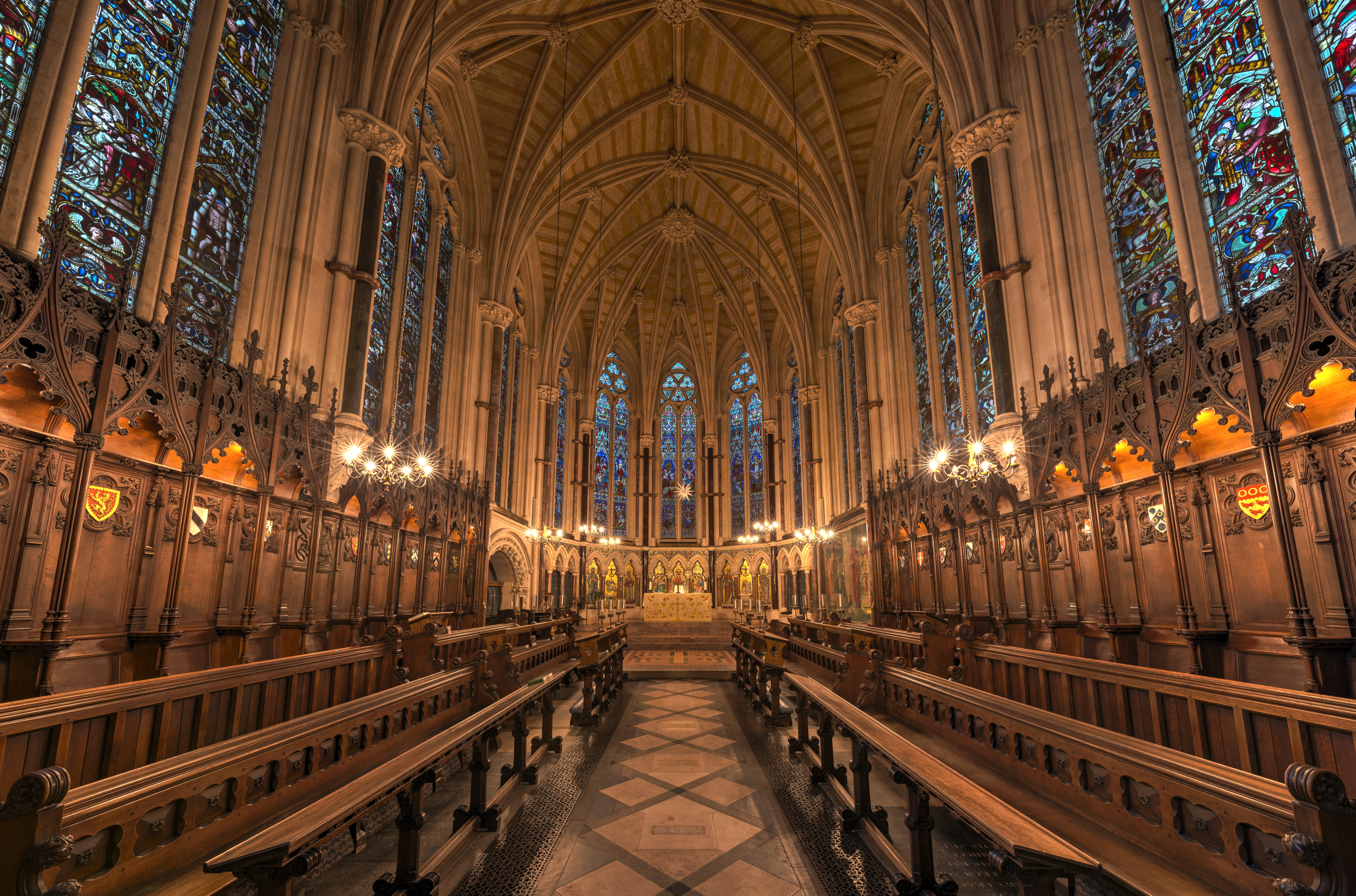
Exeter College, Oxford Chapel

St Luke's Church, Chelsea, was a new-built Commissioner's Church of 1820–1824, partly built using a grant of £8,333 towards its construction with money voted by Parliament as a result of the Church Building Act 1818. It is often said to be the first Gothic Revival church in London, and, as Charles Locke Eastlake put it: "probably the only church of its time in which the main roof was groined throughout in stone". Nonetheless, the parish was firmly low church, and the original arrangement, modified in the 1860s, was as a "preaching church" dominated by the pulpit, with a small altar and wooden galleries over the nave aisle.

The development of the private major metropolitan cemeteries was occurring at the same time as the movement; Sir William Tite pioneered the first cemetery in the Gothic style at West Norwood in 1837, with chapels, gates, and decorative features in the Gothic manner, attracting the interest of contemporary architects such as George Edmund Street, Barry, and William Burges. The style was immediately hailed a success and universally replaced the previous preference for classical design.

Not every architect or client was swept away by this tide. Although Gothic Revival succeeded in becoming an increasingly familiar style of architecture, the attempt to associate it with the notion of high church superiority, as advocated by Pugin and the ecclesiological movement, was anathema to those with ecumenical or nonconformist principles. Alexander "Greek" Thomson launched a famous attack; "We are told we should adopt [Gothic] because it is the Christian style, and this most impudent assertion has been accepted as sound doctrine even by earnest and intelligent Protestants; whereas it ought only to have force with those who believe that Christian truth attained its purest and most spiritual development at the period when this style of architecture constituted its corporeal form". Those rejecting the link between Gothic and Catholicism looked to adopt it solely for its aesthetic romantic qualities, to combine it with other styles, or look to northern European Brick Gothic for a more plain appearance; or in some instances all three of these, as at the non-denominational Abney Park Cemetery in east London, designed by William Hosking FSA in 1840.

== Viollet-le-Duc and Iron Gothic ==
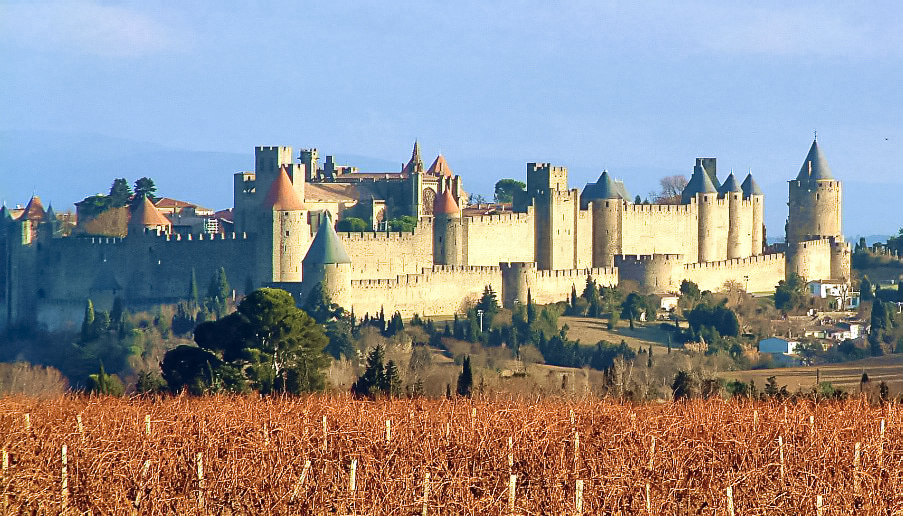
View of Carcassonne

France had lagged slightly in entering the neo-Gothic scene, but produced a major figure in the revival in Eugène Viollet-le-Duc. As well as a powerful and influential theorist, Viollet-le-Duc was a leading architect whose genius lay in restoration. (Note: In the Preface to his Dictionary of French Architecture from 11th to 16th Century (1854–1868) (Dictionnaire raisonné de l'architecture française du XIe au XVIe siècle), le-Duc wrote of the ignorance of Gothic architecture prevalent at the start of the 19th century: "as for [buildings] which had been constructed between the end of the Roman empire and the fifteenth century, they were scarcely spoken of except to be cited as the products of ignorance or barbarousness".) He believed in restoring buildings to a state of completion that they would not have known even when they were first built, theories he applied to his restorations of the walled city of Carcassonne, and to Notre-Dame and Sainte Chapelle in Paris. In this respect he differed from his English counterpart Ruskin, as he often replaced the work of mediaeval stonemasons. His rational approach to Gothic stood in stark contrast to the revival's romanticist origins. Throughout his career he remained in a quandary as to whether iron and masonry should be combined in a building. Iron, in the form of iron anchors, had been used in the most ambitious buildings of medieval Gothic, especially but not only for tracery.

It had in fact been used in "Gothic" buildings since the earliest days of the revival. In some cases, cast iron enabled something like a perfection of medieval design. It was only with Ruskin and the archaeological Gothic's demand for historical truth that iron, whether it was visible or not, was deemed improper for a Gothic building. Ultimately, the utility of iron won out: "substituting a cast iron shaft for a granite, marble or stone column is not bad, but one must agree that it cannot be considered as an innovation, as the introduction of a new principle. Replacing a stone or wooden lintel by an iron breastsummer is very good". He strongly opposed illusion, however: reacting against the casing of a cast iron pillar in stone, he wrote; "il faut que la pierre paraisse bien être de la pierre; le fer, du fer; le bois, du bois" (stone must appear to be stone; iron, iron; wood, wood).

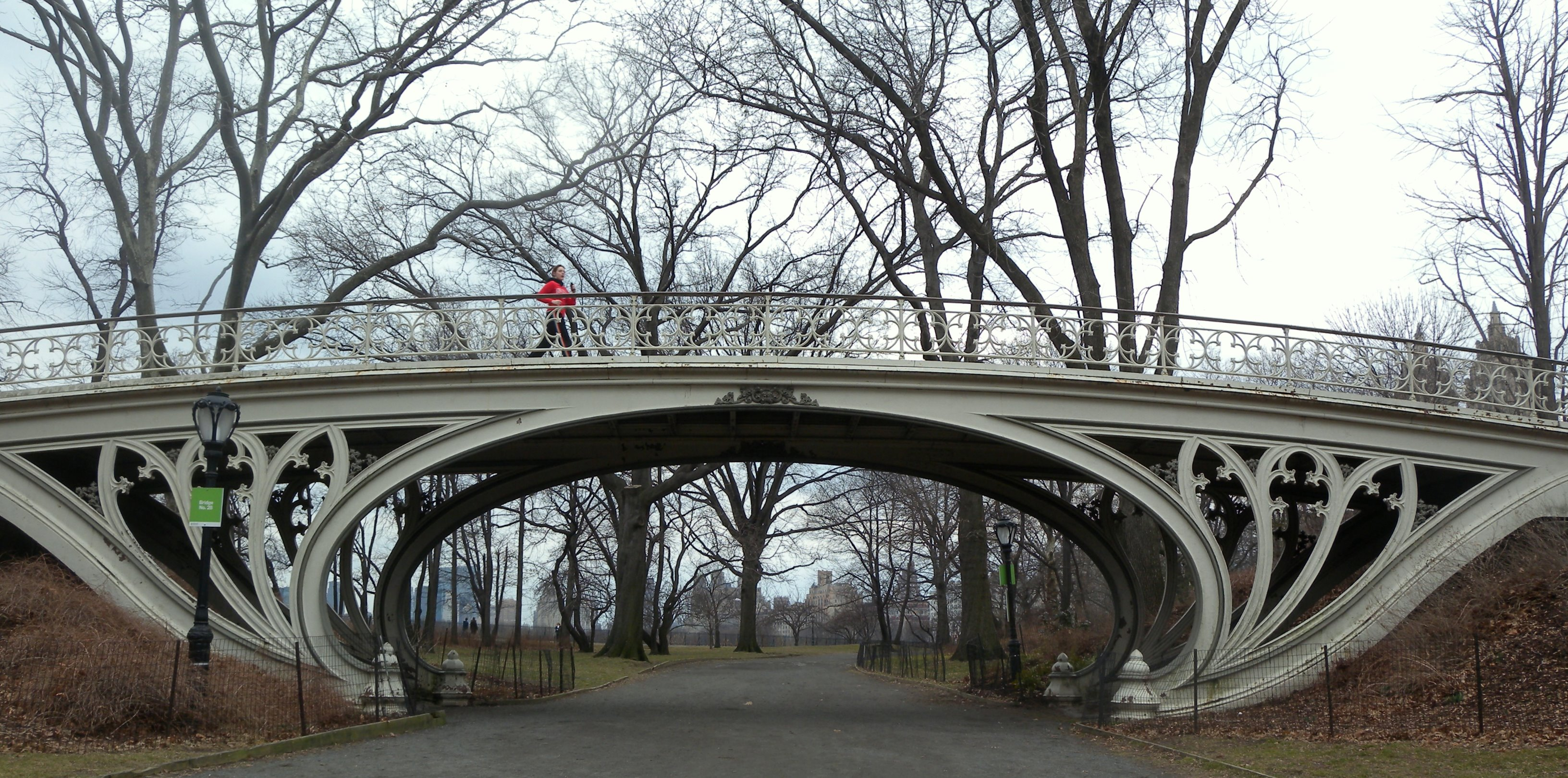
Cast-iron Gothic tracery supports a bridge by Calvert Vaux, in Central Park, New York City

The arguments against modern construction materials began to collapse in the mid-19th century as great prefabricated structures such as the glass and iron Crystal Palace and the glazed courtyard of the Oxford University Museum of Natural History were erected, which appeared to embody Gothic principles. (Note: Ruskin was unimpressed by Joseph Paxton's Crystal Palace, describing it as nothing but "a greenhouse larger than ever greenhouse was built before".) Between 1863 and 1872 Viollet-le-Duc published his Entretiens sur l'architecture, a set of daring designs for buildings that combined iron and masonry. Though these projects were never realised, they influenced several generations of designers and architects, notably Antoni Gaudí in Spain and, in England, Benjamin Bucknall, Viollet's foremost English follower and translator, whose masterpiece was Woodchester Mansion. The flexibility and strength of cast-iron freed neo-Gothic designers to create new structural Gothic forms impossible in stone, as in Calvert Vaux's cast-iron Gothic bridge in Central Park, New York dating from the 1860. Vaux enlisted openwork forms derived from Gothic blind-arcading and window tracery to express the spring and support of the arching bridge, in flexing forms that presage Art Nouveau.

== Collegiate Gothic ==
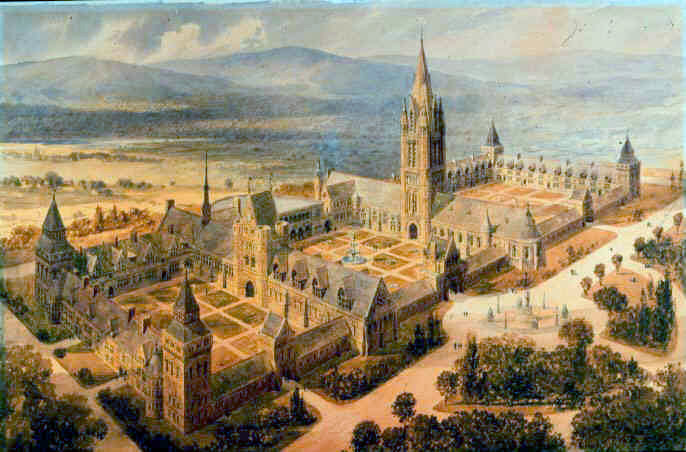
Trinity College, Hartford: Burges's revised, three-quadrangle, masterplan

In the United States, Collegiate Gothic was a late and literal resurgence of the English Gothic Revival, adapted for American college and university campuses. The term "Collegiate Gothic" originated from American architect Alexander Jackson Davis's handwritten description of his own "English Collegiate Gothic Mansion" of 1853 for the Harrals of Bridgeport. By the 1890s, the movement was known as "Collegiate Gothic".

The firm of Cope & Stewardson was an early and important exponent, transforming the campuses of Bryn Mawr College, Princeton University and the University of Pennsylvania in the 1890s. In 1872, Abner Jackson, the President of Trinity College, Connecticut, visited Britain, seeking models and an architect for a planned new campus for the college. William Burges was chosen and he drew up a four-quadrangled masterplan, in his Early French style. Lavish illustrations were produced by Axel Haig. However, the estimated cost, at just under one million dollars, together with the sheer scale of the plans, thoroughly alarmed the College Trustees and only one-sixth of the plan was executed, the present Long Walk, with Francis H. Kimball acting as local, supervising, architect, and Frederick Law Olmsted laying out the grounds. Hitchcock considers the result, "perhaps the most satisfactory of all of [Burges's] works and the best example anywhere of Victorian Gothic collegiate architecture".

The movement continued into the 20th century, with Cope & Stewardson's campus for Washington University in St. Louis (1900–1909), Charles Donagh Maginnis's buildings at Boston College (1910s) (including Gasson Hall), Ralph Adams Cram's design for the Princeton University Graduate College (1913), and James Gamble Rogers' reconstruction of the campus of Yale University (1920s). Charles Klauder's Gothic Revival skyscraper on the University of Pittsburgh's campus, the Cathedral of Learning (1926) exhibited Gothic stylings both inside and out, while using modern technologies to make the building taller.

== Vernacular adaptations and the revival in Oceania ==
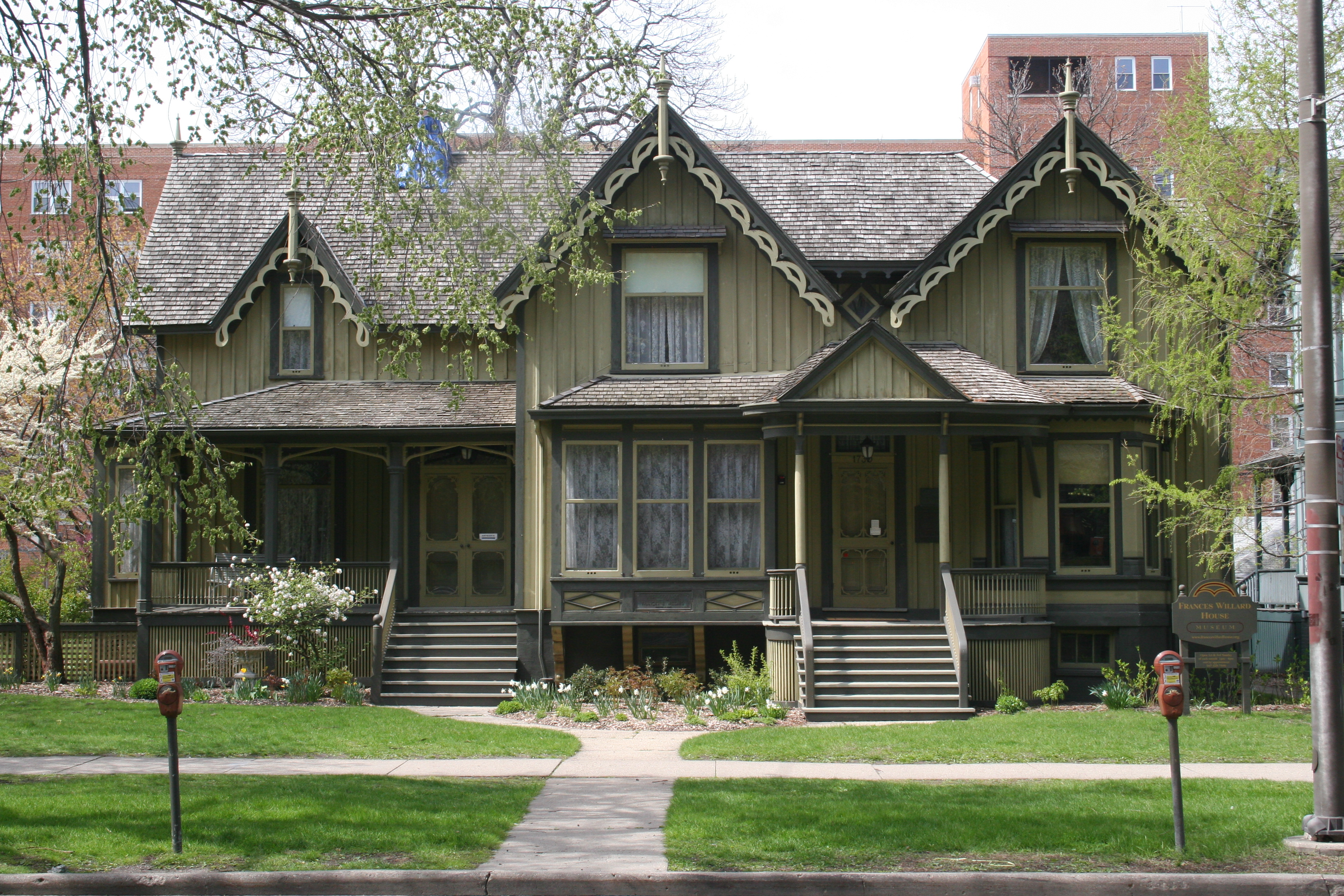
Frances Willard House, in Evanston, Illinois, an example of Carpenter Gothic.

Carpenter Gothic houses and small churches became common in North America and other places in the late 19th century. These structures adapted Gothic elements such as pointed arches, steep gables, and towers to traditional American light-frame construction. The invention of the scroll saw and mass-produced wood moldings allowed a few of these structures to mimic the florid fenestration of the High Gothic. But, in most cases, Carpenter Gothic buildings were relatively unadorned, retaining only the basic elements of pointed-arch windows and steep gables. A well-known example of Carpenter Gothic is a house in Eldon, Iowa, that Grant Wood used for the background of his painting American Gothic.

=== Australia ===
Australia, in particular in Melbourne and Sydney, saw the construction of large numbers of Gothic Revival buildings. William Wardell (1823–1899) was among the country's most prolific architects; born and trained in England, after emigrating his most notable Australian designs include St Patrick's Cathedral, Melbourne and St John's College and St Mary's Cathedral in Sydney. In common with many other 19th century architects, Wardell could deploy different styles at the command of his clients; Government House, Melbourne is Italianate. His banking house for the English, Scottish and Australian Bank in Melbourne has been described as "the Australian masterpiece of neo-Gothic". This claim has also been made for Edmund Blacket's MacLaurin Hall at the University of Sydney, which sits in the quadrangle complex described as "arguably the most important group of Gothic and Tudor Revival style architecture in Australia".

=== New Zealand ===
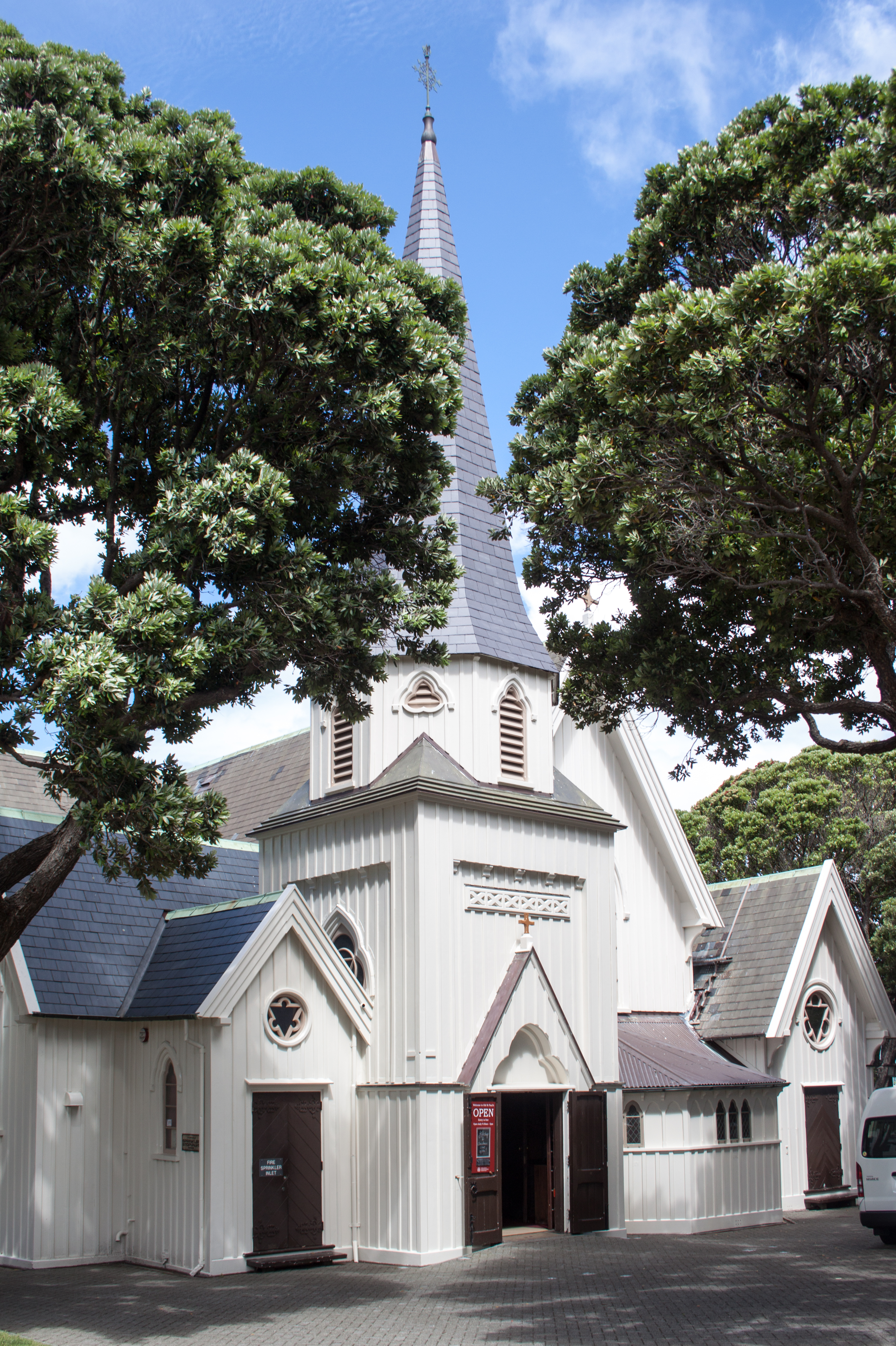
Old St Paul's in Wellington, New Zealand

Benjamin Mountfort, born in Britain, trained in Birmingham, and subsequently resident in Canterbury, New Zealand imported the Gothic Revival style to his adopted country and designed Gothic Revival churches in both wood and stone, notably in the city of Christchurch.

Frederick Thatcher designed wooden churches in the Gothic Revival style, for example Old St. Paul's, Wellington, contributing to what has been described as New Zealand's "one memorable contribution to world architecture". St Mary of the Angels, Wellington by Frederick de Jersey Clere is in the French Gothic style, and was the first Gothic design church built in ferro-concrete. Other examples in Wellington include John Sydney Swan's now-demolished Erskine College.

The style also found favour in the southern New Zealand city of Dunedin, where the wealth brought in by the Otago gold rush of the 1860s allowed for substantial stone edifices to be constructed, using hard, dark breccia stone and a local white limestone, Oamaru stone. Among them were Maxwell Bury's University of Otago Registry Building and the Dunedin Law Courts by John Campbell.

Welsh-born William Skinner designed the third and current building for St Paul's in Auckland in the Gothic Revival style. Known as the 'Mother Church', due to its foundation within a year of the city’s establishment in 1841, the dark Rangitoto basalt and light Oamaru limestone church was consecrated in 1895. Skinner also designed the kauri timber St James' Union Church in Thames in the Gothic style.

=== Pacific islands ===
Several examples of Gothic Revival architecture can be found among the buildings of the Pacific islands. Notable among these is Sacred Heart Church in Levuka, Fiji, built by Father Louyot in 1858. This unusual structure consists of a church and presbytery in a local version of Carpenter Gothic alongside a stone church tower.

== Global Gothic ==
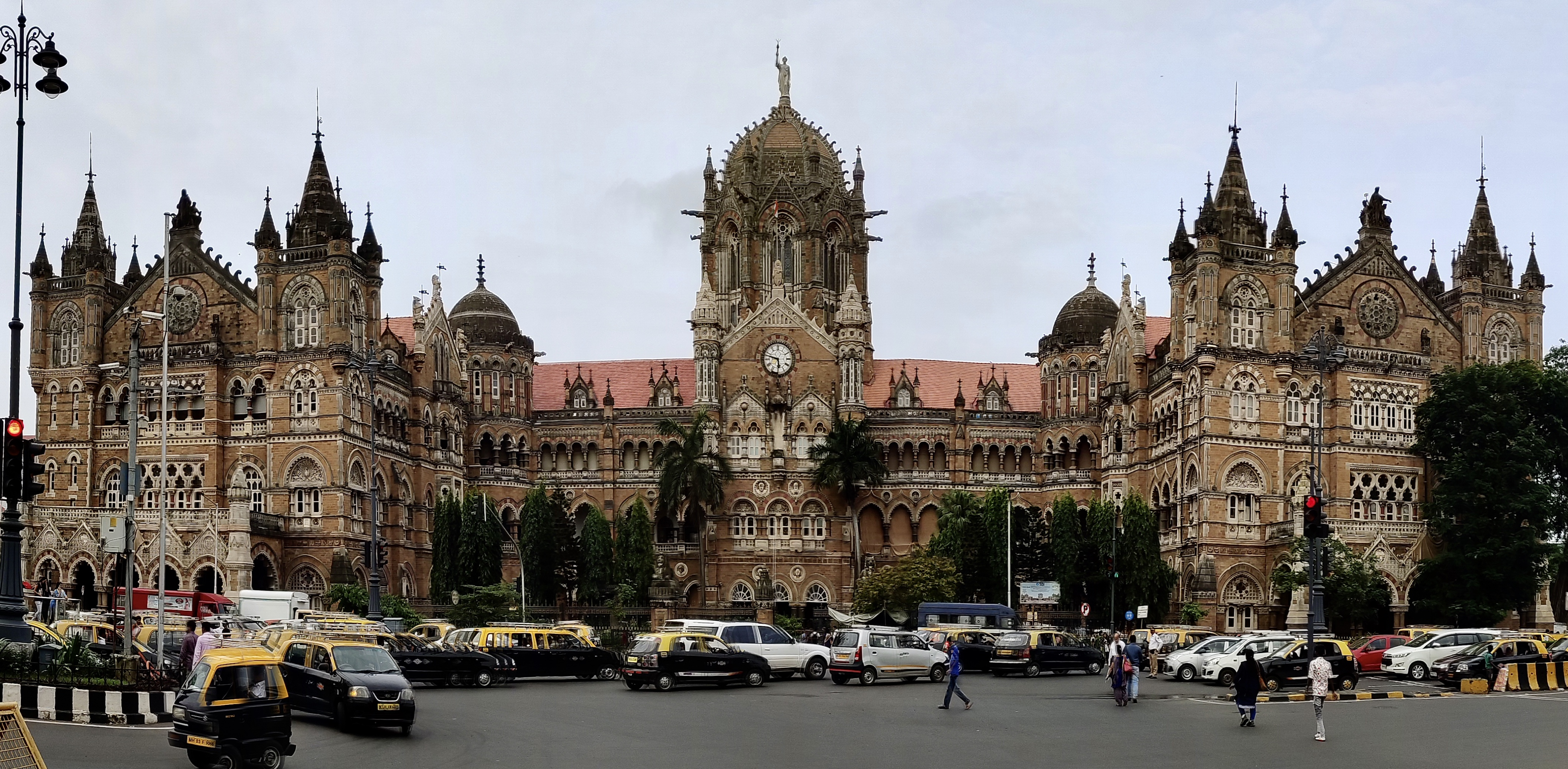
Chhatrapati Shivaji Terminus in Mumbai, India. A mixture of Romanesque, Gothic and Indian elements.

Henry-Russell Hitchcock, the architectural historian, noted the spread of the Gothic Revival in the 19th and early 20th centuries, "wherever English culture extended – as far as the West Coast of the United States and to the remotest Antipodes". The British Empire, almost at its geographic peak at the height of the Gothic Revival, assisted or compelled this spread. The English-speaking dominions, Canada, Australia particularly the state of Victoria and New Zealand generally adopted British styles in toto (see above); other parts of the empire saw regional adaptations. India saw the construction of many such buildings, in styles termed Indo-Saracenic or Hindu-Gothic. (Note: William Burges's unexecuted plans for the Sir J. J. School of Art, the “most marvellous design that he ever made”, were described as “compelling rigid thirteenth century Gothic to fulfil the requirements of the torrid zone”.) Notable examples include Chhatrapati Shivaji Terminus (formerly Victoria Terminus) and the Taj Mahal Palace Hotel, both in Mumbai. At the hill station of Shimla, the summer capital of British India, an attempt was made to recreate the Home counties in the foothills of the Himalayas. Although Gothic Revival was the predominant architectural style, alternatives were also deployed; Rashtrapati Niwas, the former Viceregal Lodge, has been variously described as Scottish Baronial Revival, Tudor Revival and Jacobethan. (Note: Thomas R. Metcalf, in his study An Imperial Vision: Indian Architecture and the British Raj, records a debate at the Royal Society of Arts in London in 1873 between proponents of the European and indigenous approaches. While T. Roger Smith contended that, "as our administration exhibits European justice, order, law and honour, so our buildings ought to hold up a high standard of European art", William Emerson argued that "it is impossible for the architecture of the west to be suitable for the natives of the east".)

Other examples in the east include the late 19th century Church of the Saviour, Beijing, constructed on the orders of the Guangxu Emperor and designed by the Catholic missionary and architect Alphonse Favier; and the Wat Niwet Thammaprawat in the Bang Pa-In Royal Palace in Bangkok, by the Italian Joachim Grassi. In Indonesia, (the former colony of the Dutch East Indies), the Jakarta Cathedral was begun in 1891 and completed in 1901 by Dutch architect Antonius Dijkmans; while further north in the islands of the Philippines, the San Sebastian Church, designed by architects Genaro Palacios and Gustave Eiffel, was consecrated in 1891 in the still Spanish colony. Church building in South Africa was extensive, with little or no effort to adopt vernacular forms. Robert Gray, the first bishop of Cape Town, wrote; "I am sure we do not overestimate the importance of real Churches built after the fashion of our English churches". He oversaw the construction of some fifty such buildings between 1848 and his death in 1872. (Note: An unusual feature of the church building programme overseen by Bishop Gray was that the majority of the churches were designed by his wife, Sophy, a considerable rarity at a time when women were almost entirely excluded from the professions.) South America saw a later flourishing of the Revival, particularly in church architecture, for example the Metropolitan Cathedral of São Paulo in Brazil by the German Maximilian Emil Hehl, the Basilica of the National Vow in Ecuador, the Sanctuary of Las Lajas in Colombia, the Basílica de Nuestra Señora del Perpetuo Socorro in Chile, the Church of the Virgin of Mount Carmel and St. Thérèse of Lisieux in Uruguay, or the Cathedral of La Plata in Argentina.

== 20th and 21st centuries ==
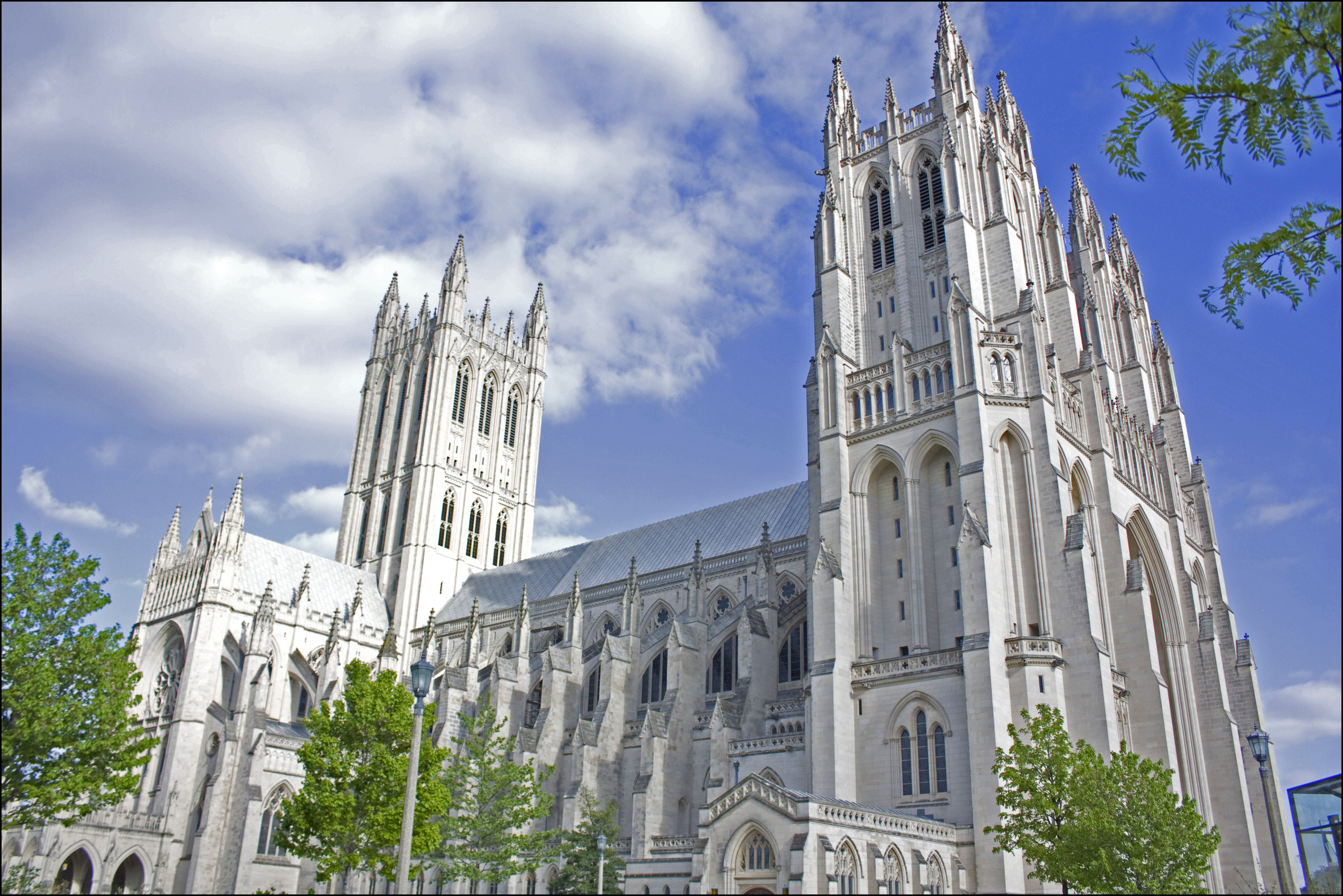
Construction of Washington National Cathedral began in 1907 and was completed in 1990.

The Gothic style dictated the use of structural members in compression, leading to tall, buttressed buildings with interior columns of load-bearing masonry and tall, narrow windows. But, by the start of the 20th century, technological developments such as the steel frame, the incandescent light bulb and the elevator made this approach obsolete. Steel framing supplanted the non-ornamental functions of rib vaults and flying buttresses, providing wider open interiors with fewer columns interrupting the view.

Some architects persisted in using Neo-Gothic tracery as applied ornamentation to an iron skeleton underneath, for example in Cass Gilbert's 1913 Woolworth Building skyscraper in New York and Raymond Hood's 1922 Tribune Tower in Chicago. The Tower Life Building in San Antonio, completed in 1929, is noted for the arrays of decorative gargoyles on its upper floors. But, over the first half of the century, Neo-Gothic was supplanted by Modernism, although some modernist architects saw the Gothic tradition of architectural form entirely in terms of the "honest expression" of the technology of the day, and saw themselves as heirs to that tradition, with their use of rectangular frames and exposed iron girders.

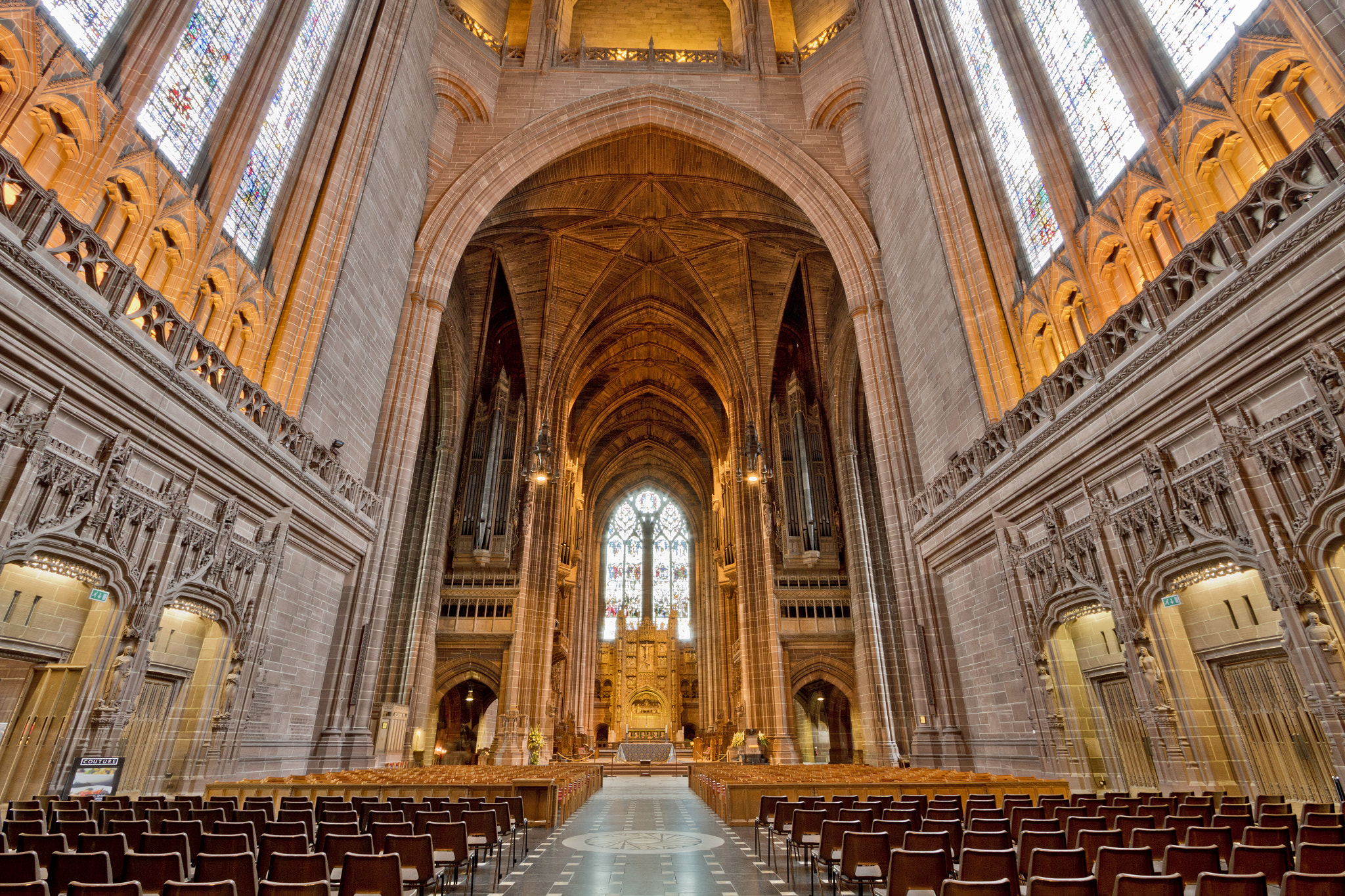
Liverpool Cathedral, whose construction ran from 1903 to 1978

In spite of this, the Gothic Revival continued to exert its influence, simply because many of its more massive projects were still being built well into the second half of the 20th century, such as Giles Gilbert Scott's Liverpool Cathedral and the Washington National Cathedral (1907–1990). Ralph Adams Cram became a leading force in American Gothic, his most ambitious project being the Cathedral of St. John the Divine in New York (claimed to be the largest cathedral in the world); another was the Collegiate Gothic buildings at Princeton University. Cram said "the style hewn out and perfected by our ancestors [has] become ours by uncontested inheritance".

Though the number of new Gothic Revival buildings declined sharply after the 1930s, they continue to be built. St Edmundsbury Cathedral, the cathedral of Bury St Edmunds in Suffolk, was expanded and reconstructed in a neo-Gothic style between the late 1950s and 2005, and a commanding stone central tower was added. A new church in the Gothic style is planned for St. John Vianney Parish in Fishers, Indiana. The Whittle Building at Peterhouse, University of Cambridge, opened in 2016, matches the neo-Gothic style of the rest of the courtyard in which it is situated.

== Appreciation ==
By 1872, the Gothic Revival was mature enough in the United Kingdom that Charles Locke Eastlake, an influential professor of design, could produce A History of the Gothic Revival. Kenneth Clark's, The Gothic Revival. An Essay, followed in 1928, in which he described the Revival as "the most widespread and influential artistic movement which England has ever produced." The architect and writer Harry Stuart Goodhart-Rendel covered the subject of the Revival in an appreciative way in his Slade Lectures in 1934. (Note: In his speech in 1976, on receiving the RIBA Gold Medal, Sir John Summerson recalled Rendel's contribution; "It was well known that Victorian architecture was bad or screamingly funny, or both. Rendel begged to differ, but what really stunned his audience was that he knew, and knew in great detail, what he was talking about".) But the conventional early 20th century view of the architecture of the Gothic Revival was strongly dismissive, critics writing of "the nineteenth century architectural tragedy", ridiculing "the uncompromising ugliness" of the era's buildings and attacking the "sadistic hatred of beauty" of its architects. (Note: Kenneth Clark, despite his sympathetic approach, recalled that during his Oxford years it was generally believed not only that Keble College was "the ugliest building in the world" but that its architect was John Ruskin, author of The Stones of Venice. The college was built to the designs of the architect William Butterfield.) The 1950s saw further signs of a recovery in the reputation of Revival architecture. John Steegman's study, Consort of Taste (re-issued in 1970 as Victorian Taste, with a foreword by Nikolaus Pevsner), (Note: Nikolaus Pevsner was another early advocate of taking Victorian architecture seriously, and experienced similar challenges to Harry Stuart Goodhart-Rendel in conveying this message to a wider audience. The writer Michael Farr recalled a lecture given by Pevsner during the latter's tenure as Slade Professor of Fine Art at Cambridge; "His student audience used to roll about in helpless laughter at his slides of Keble College, the Albert Memorial and other examples of hilariously 'outrageous' Victorian design. [Pevsner] used to pause for a second or two, clear his throat and then continue with dogged determination.") was published in 1950 and began a slow turn in the tide of opinion "towards a more serious and sympathetic assessment." In 1958, Henry-Russell Hitchcock published his Architecture: Nineteenth and Twentieth Centuries, as part of the Pelican History of Art series edited by Nikolaus Pevsner. Hitchcock devoted substantial chapters to the Gothic Revival, noting that, while "there is no more typical nineteenth-century product than a Victorian Gothic church", the success of the Victorian Gothic saw its practitioners design mansions, castles, colleges, and parliaments. The same year saw the foundation of the Victorian Society in England and, in 1963, the publication of Victorian Architecture, an influential collection of essays edited by Peter Ferriday. By 2008, the fiftieth anniversary of the founding of the Victorian Society, the architecture of the Gothic Revival was more fully appreciated with some of its leading architects receiving scholarly attention and some of its best buildings, such as George Gilbert Scott's St Pancras Station Hotel, being magnificently restored. The Society's 50th anniversary publication, Saving A Century, surveyed a half-century of losses and successes, reflected on the changing perceptions toward Victorian architecture and concluded with a chapter entitled "The Victorians Victorious".

== Gallery ==
=== Europe ===
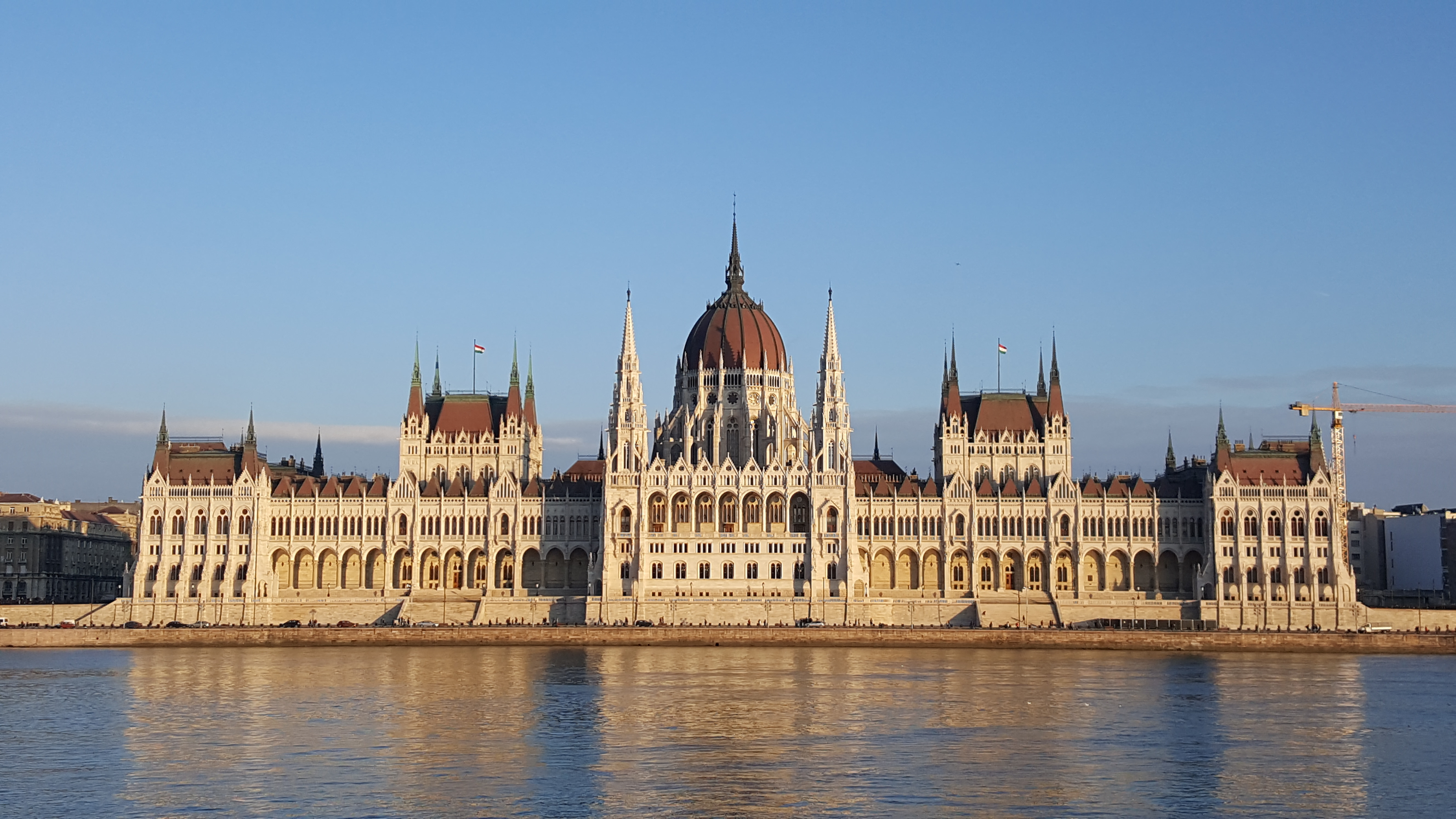
Hungarian Parliament Building, Budapest, Hungary: 1885–1904

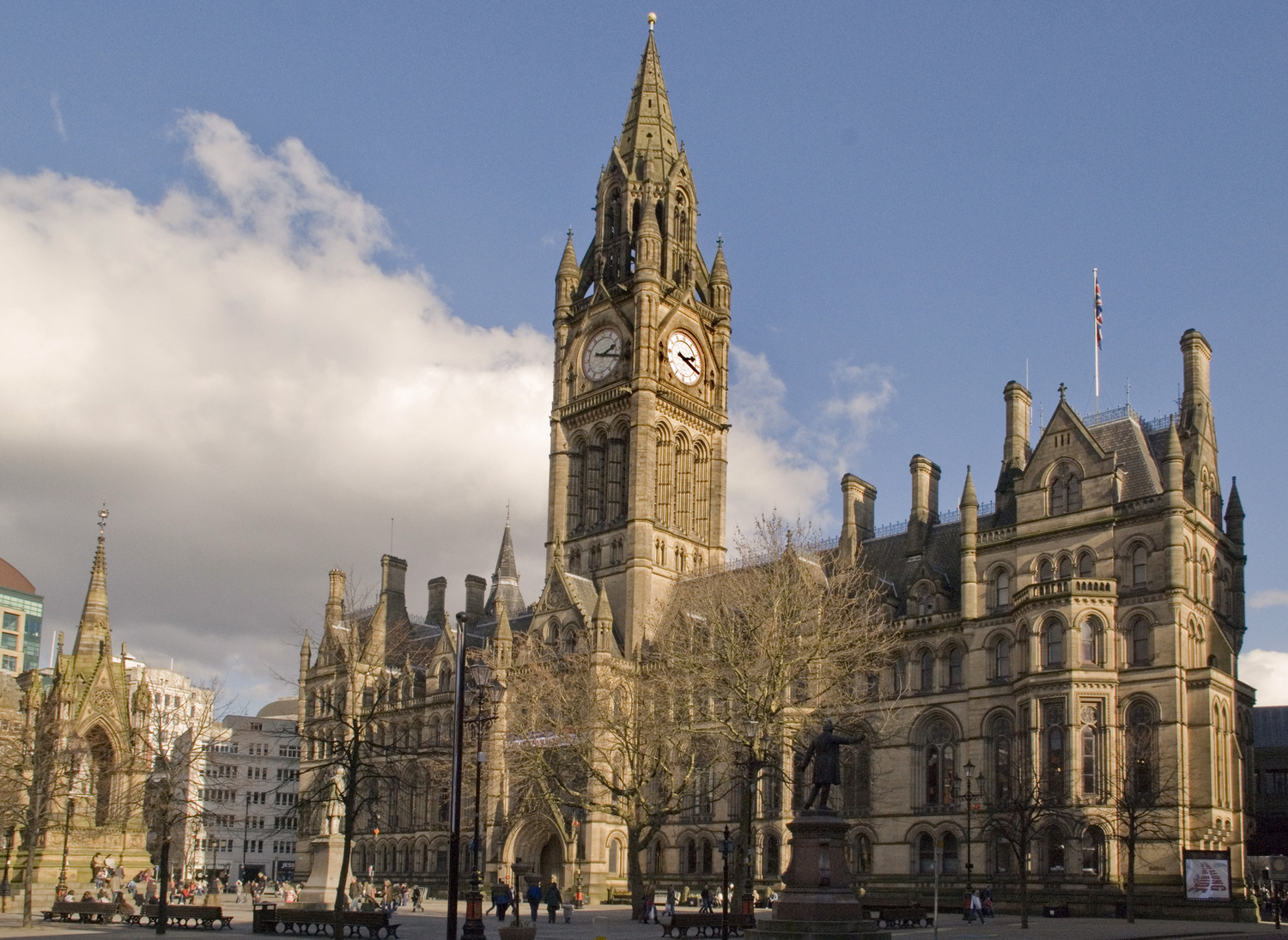
Manchester Town Hall, England: 1868–1877

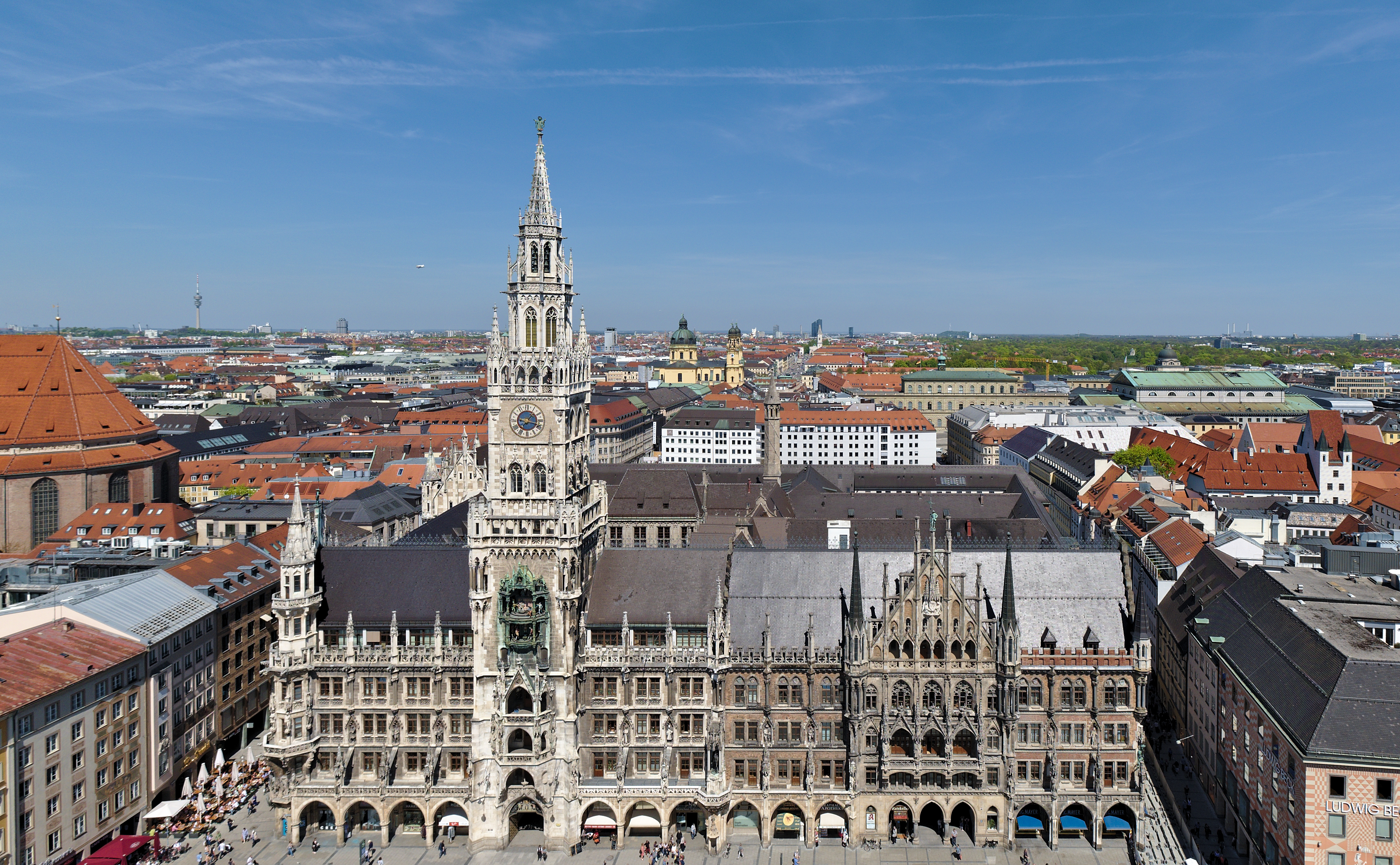
New Town Hall, Munich, Germany: 1867–1874

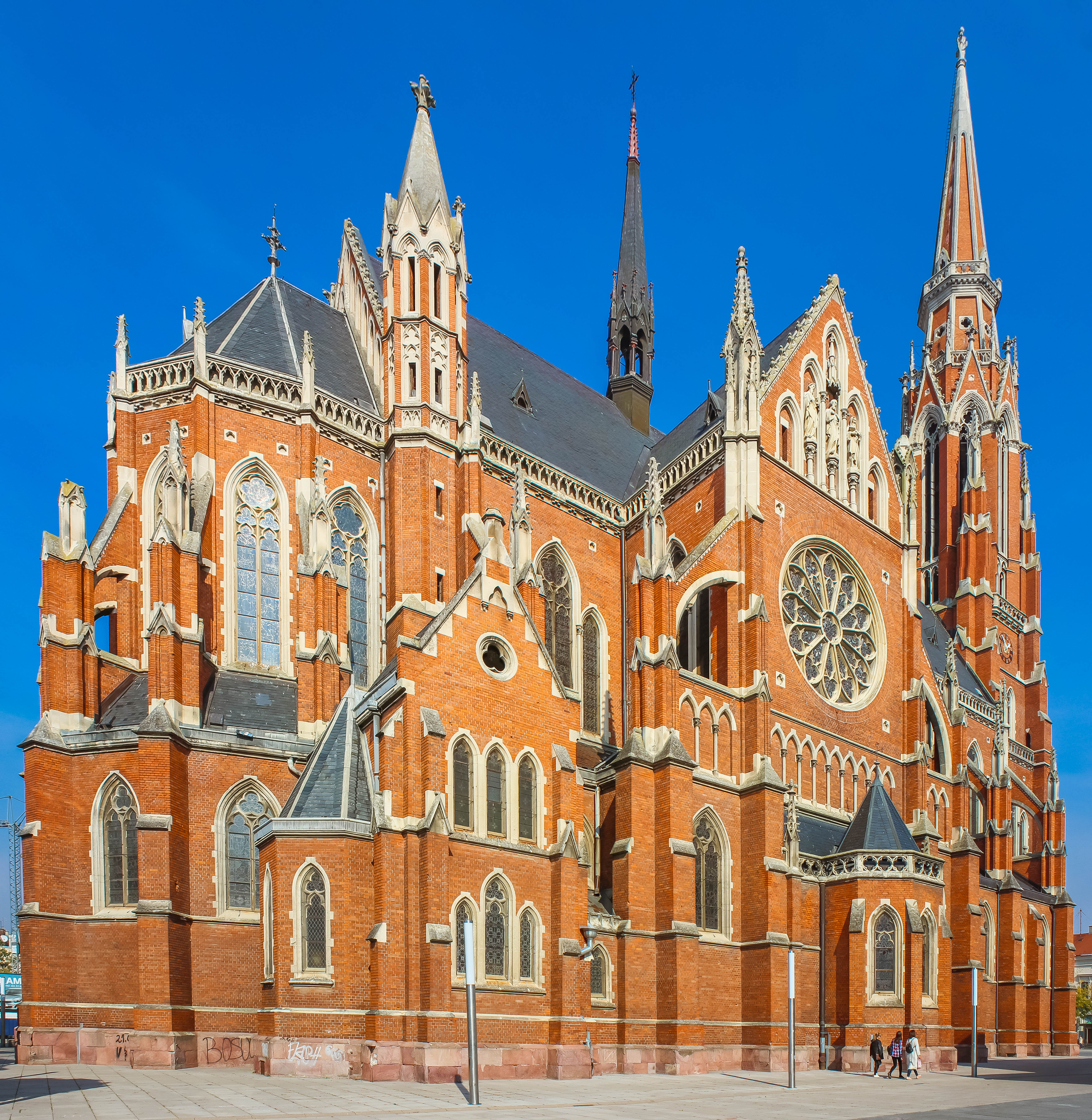
Co-cathedral, Osijek, Croatia: 1898

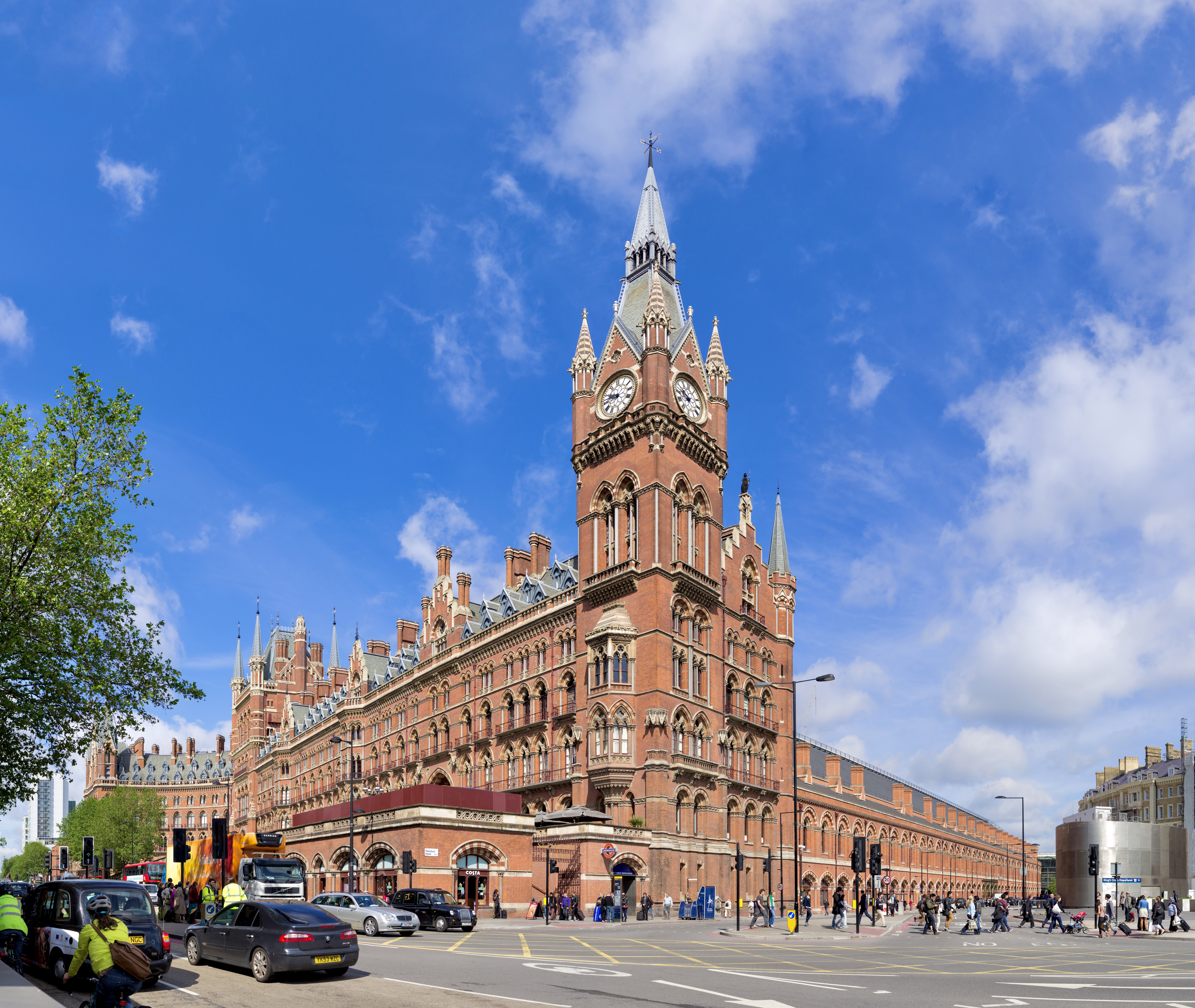
St Pancras railway station, London, England: 1863–1868

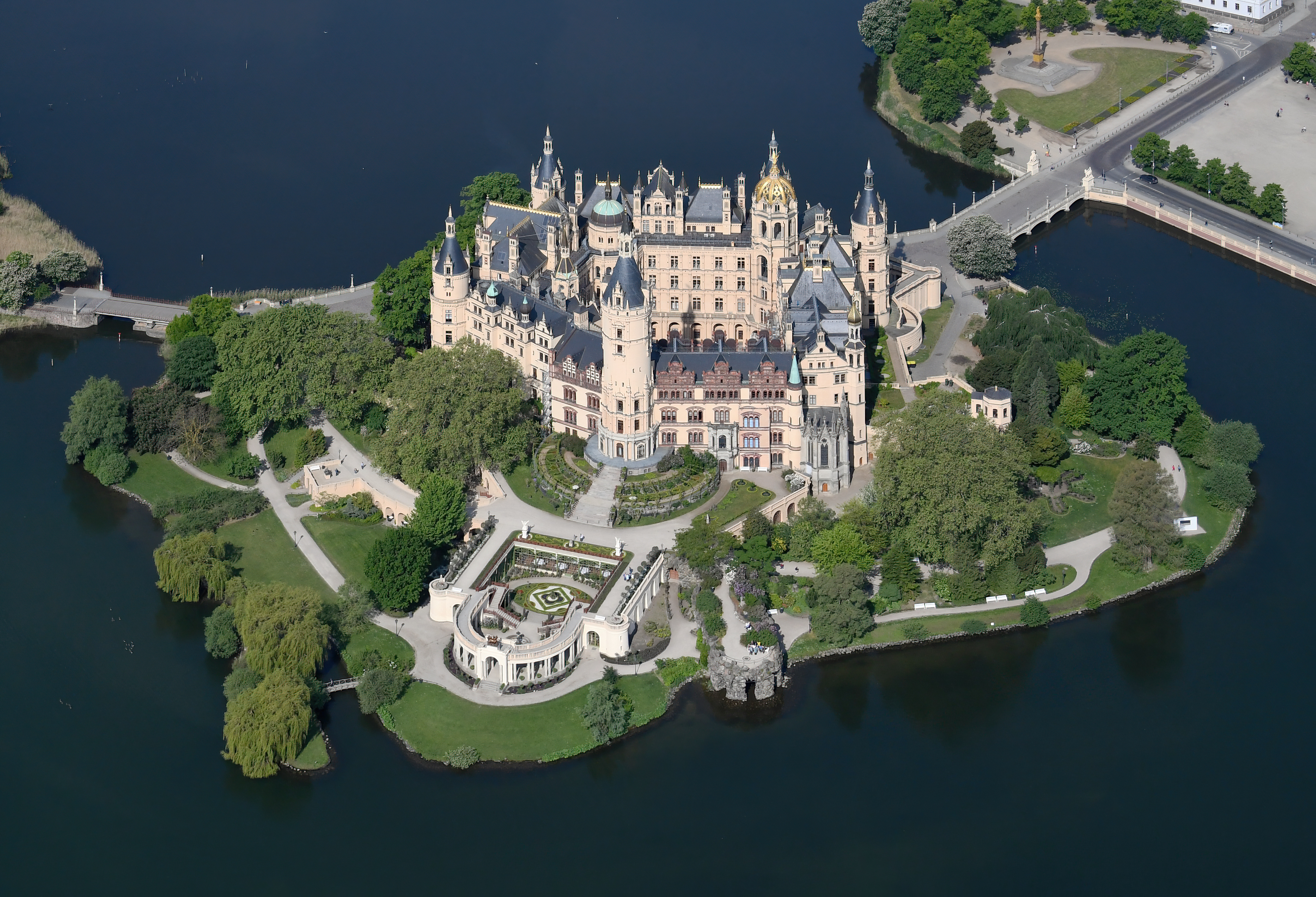
Schwerin Castle, Germany: 1845–1857

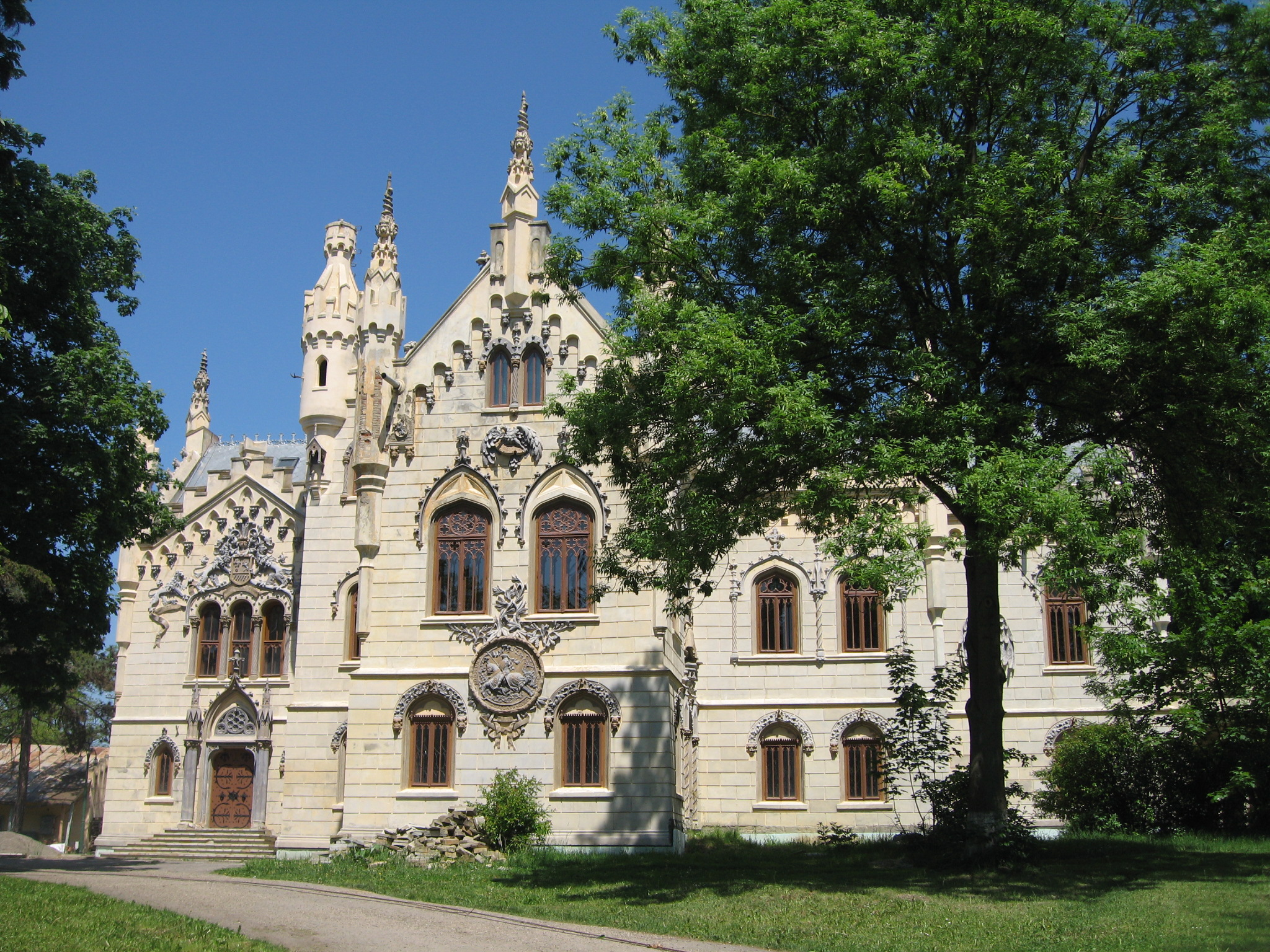
Sturdza Palace, Iași County, Romania: 1880–1904

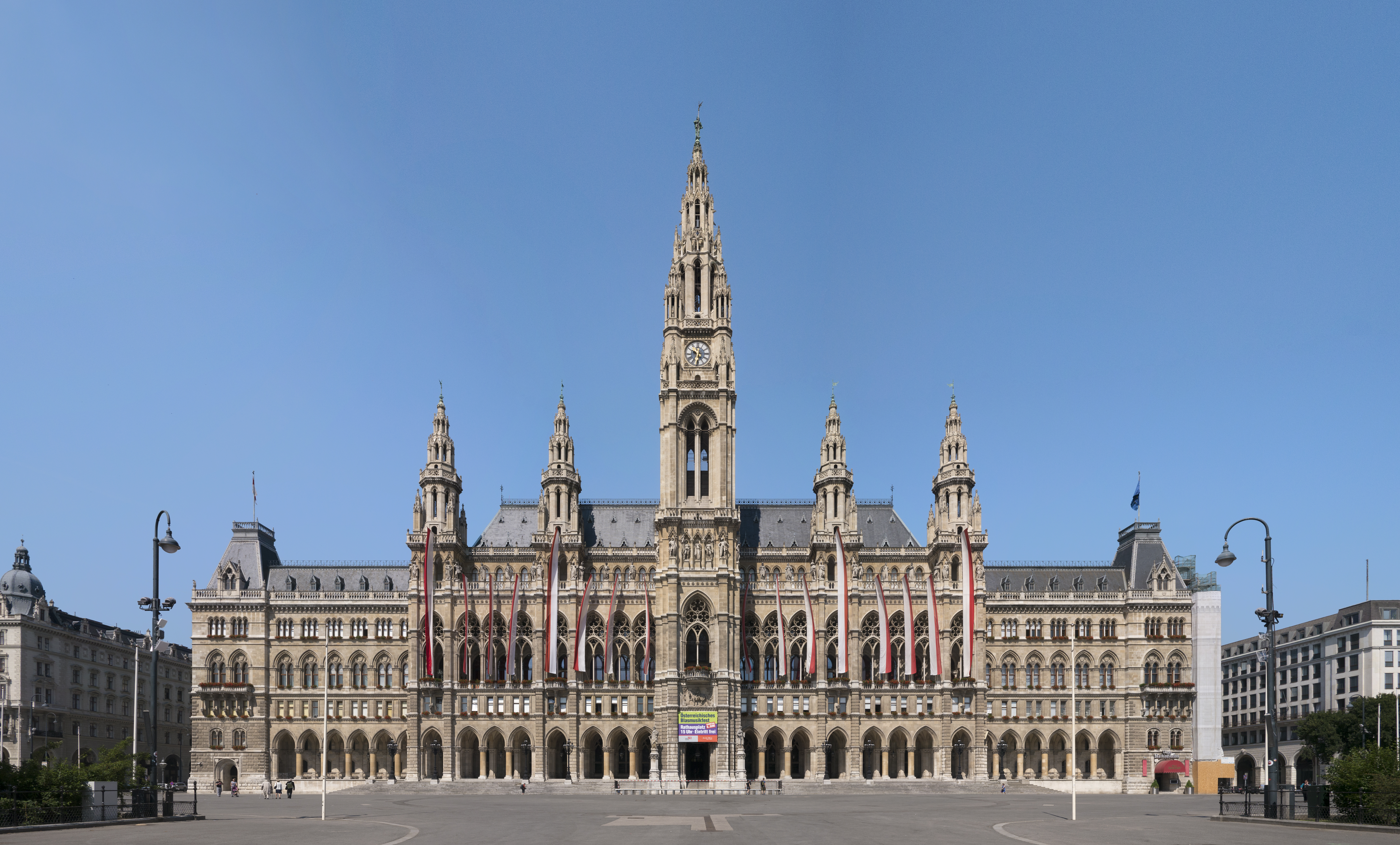
Vienna City Hall, Austria: 1872–1883

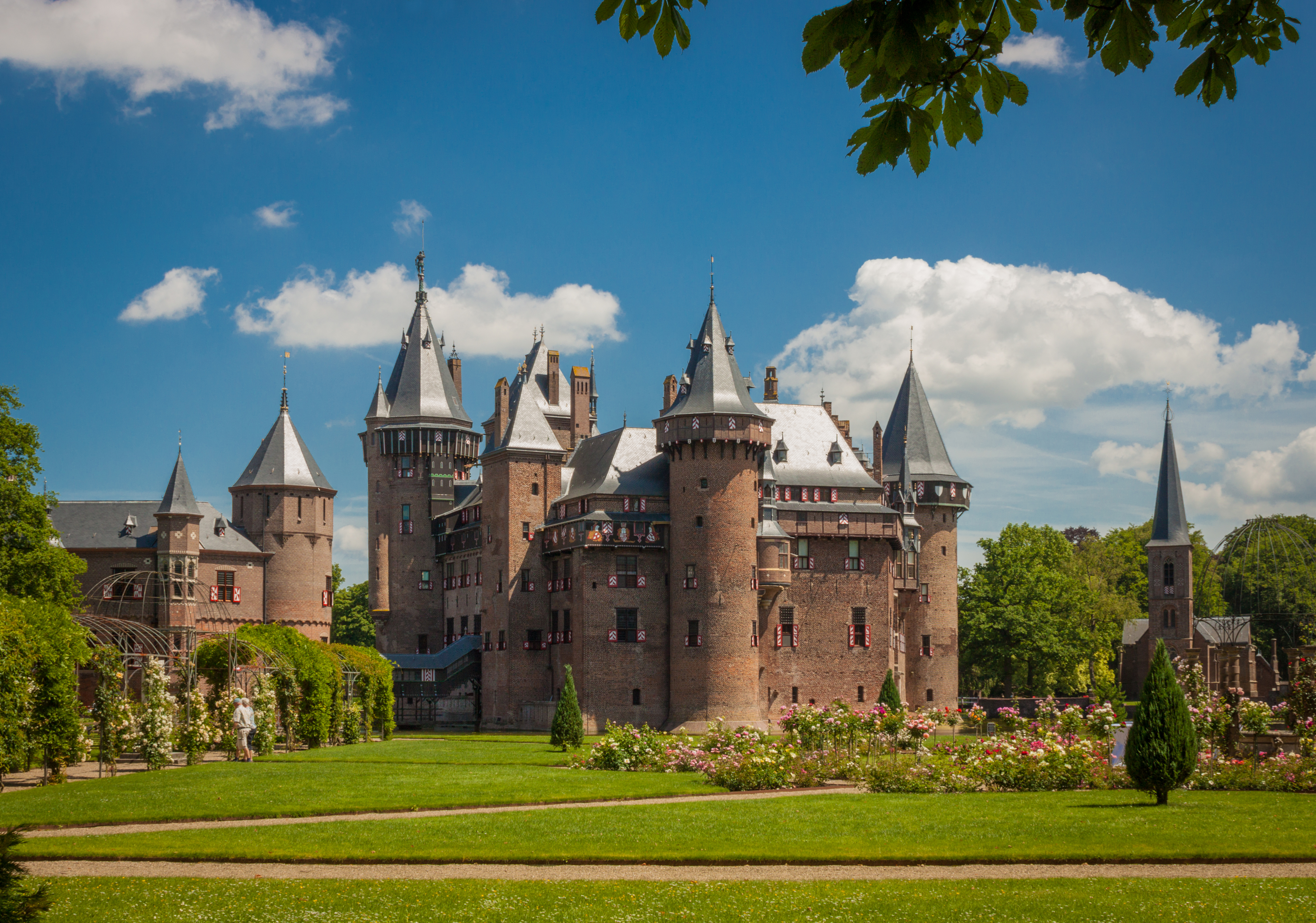
De Haar Castle, Utrecht, Netherlands: 1892–1907

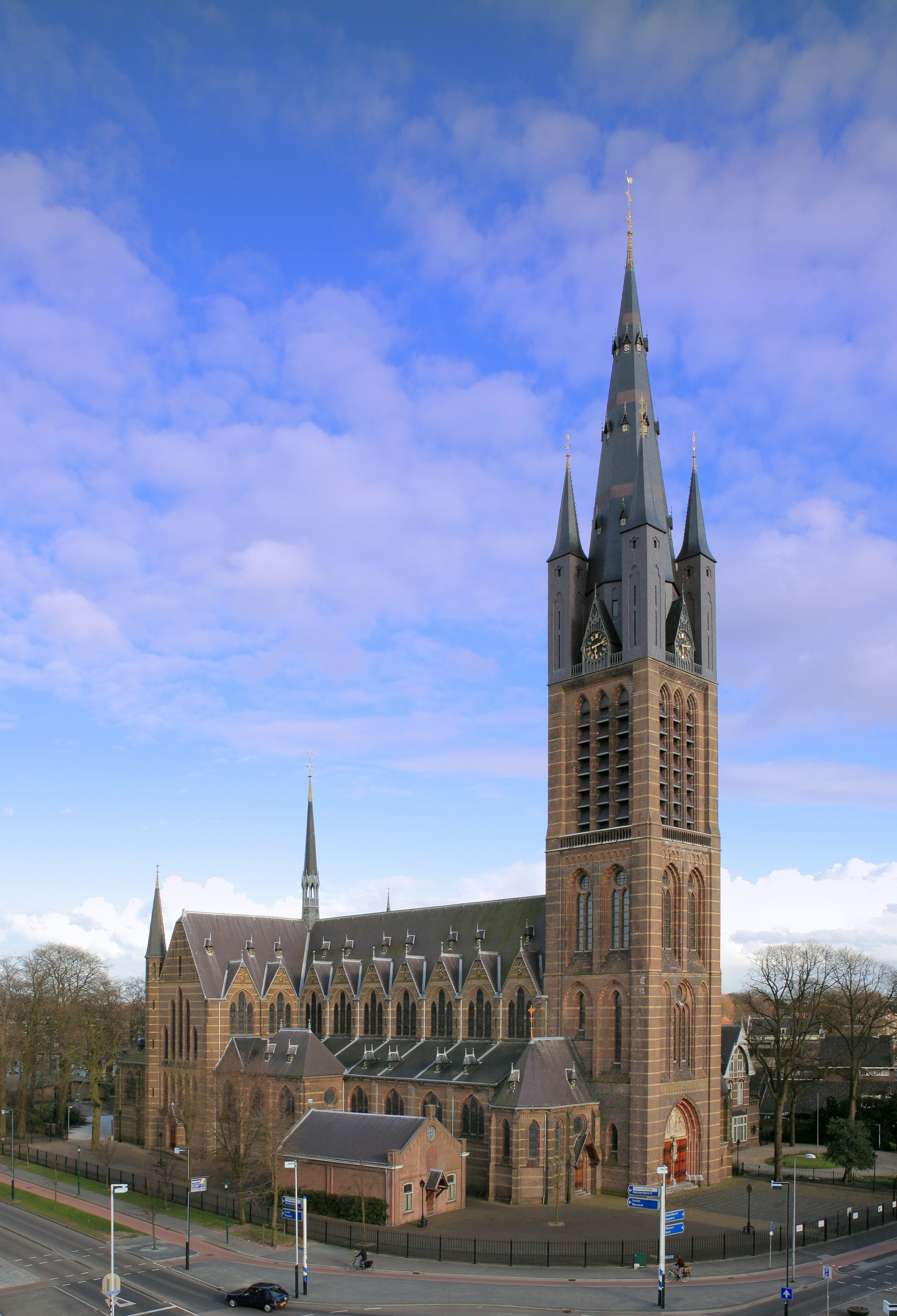
Sint-Vituskerk (Hilversum), Hilversum, Netherlands: 1890-1892

=== North America ===
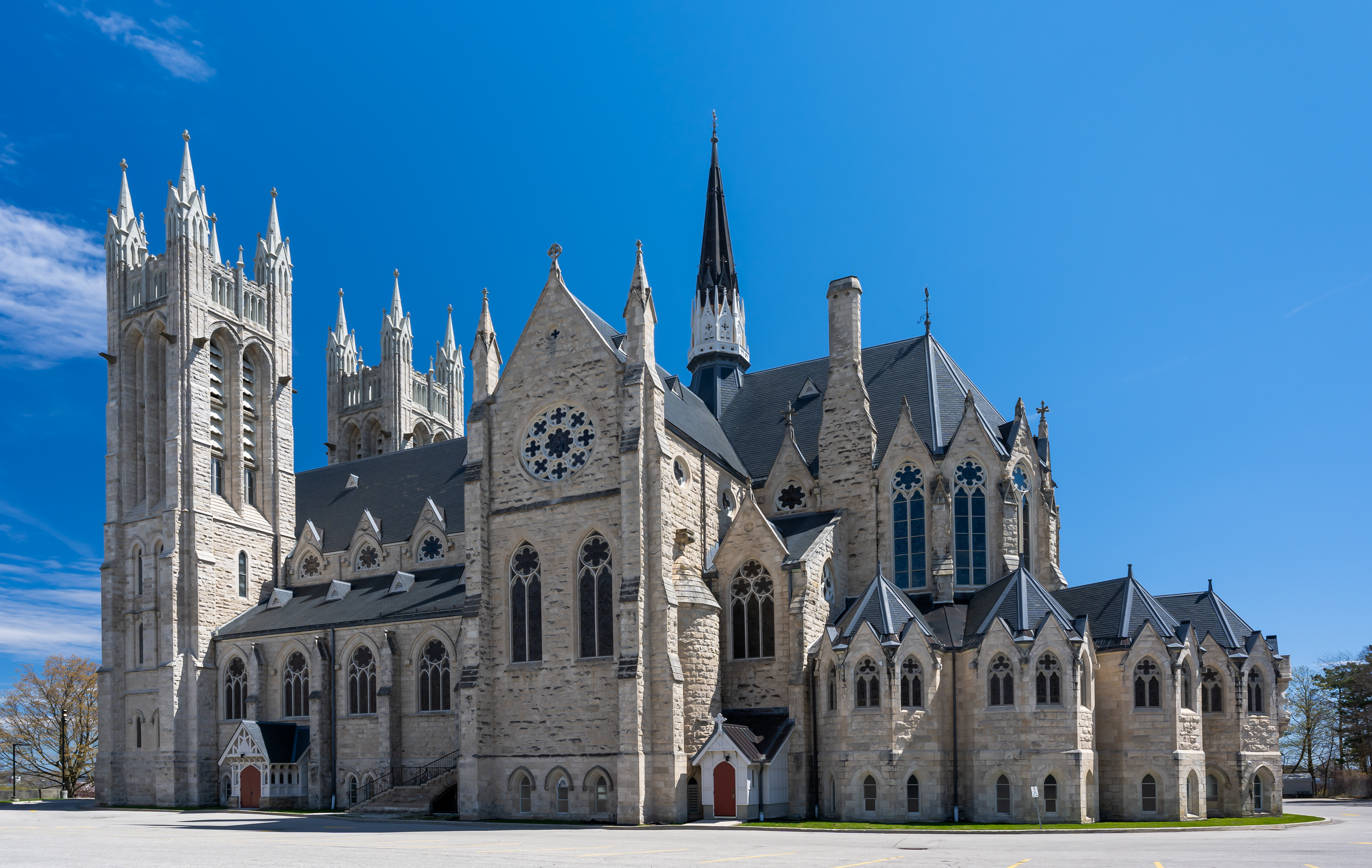
Basilica of Our Lady Immaculate, Guelph, Ontario, Canada: 1876–1888

Centre Block of the Canadian Parliament Buildings, Ottawa, Canada: 1916–1920

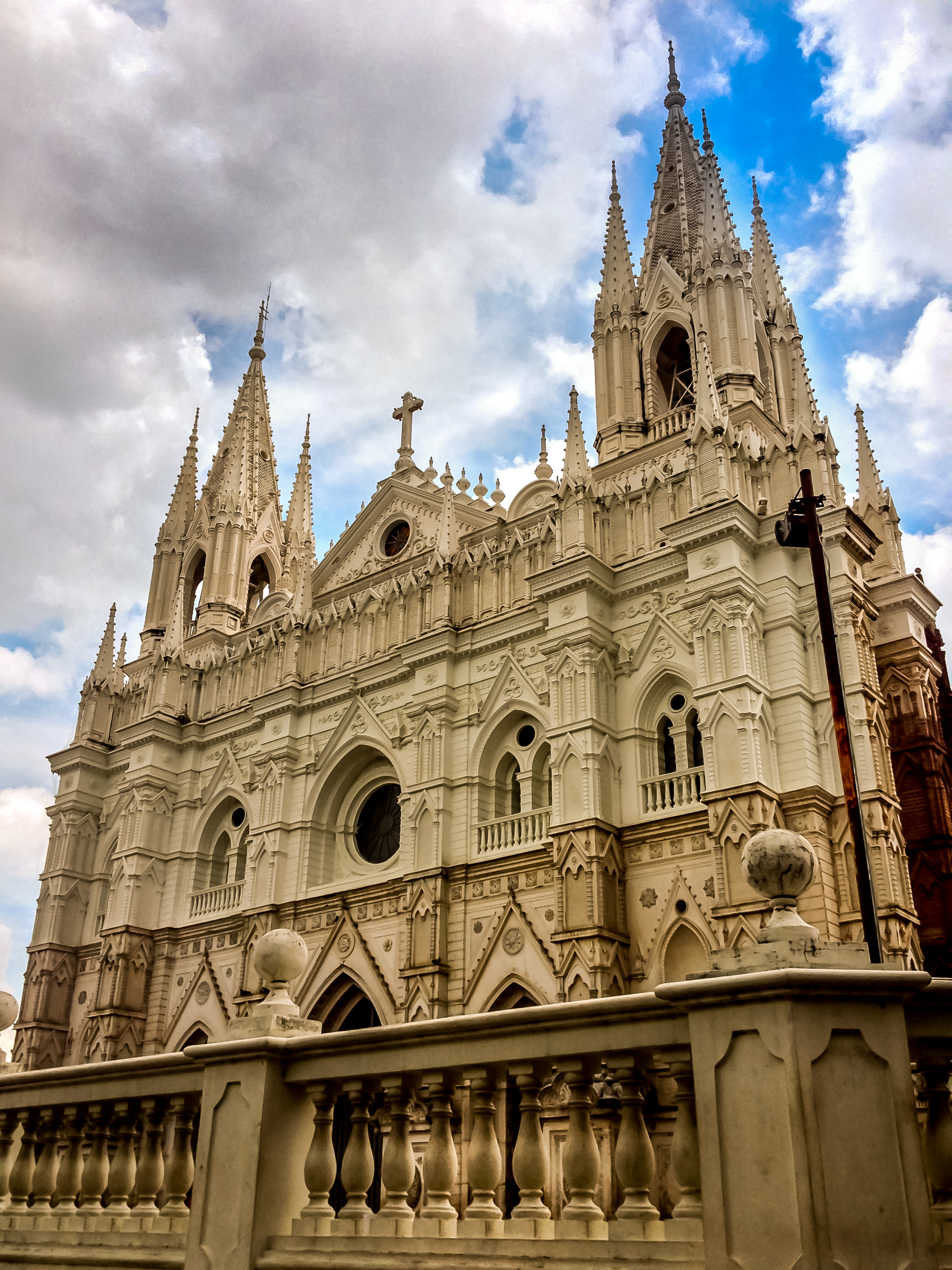
Cathedral of Santa Ana, El Salvador: 1906–1913

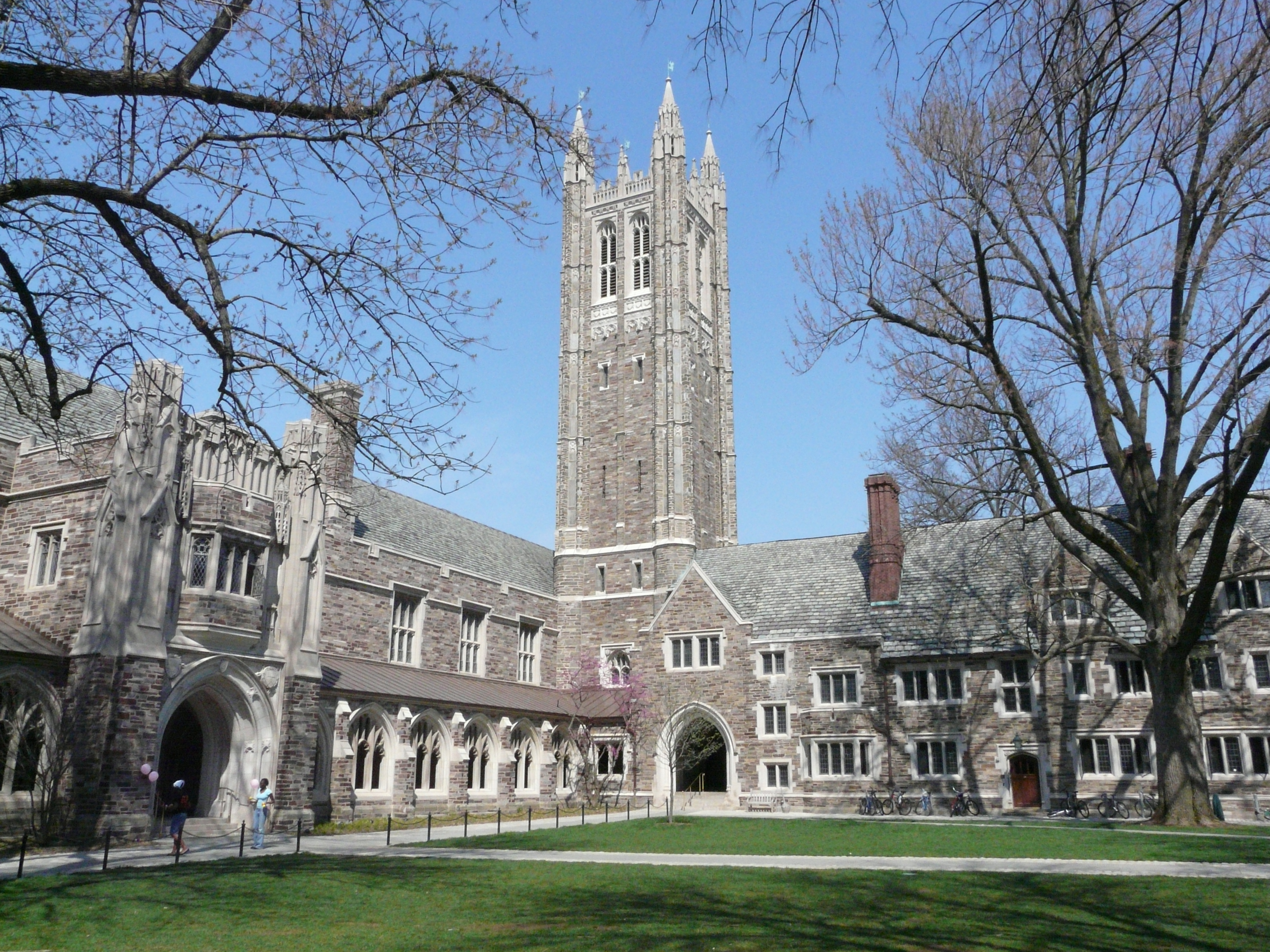
Rockefeller College, Princeton, USA: 1877

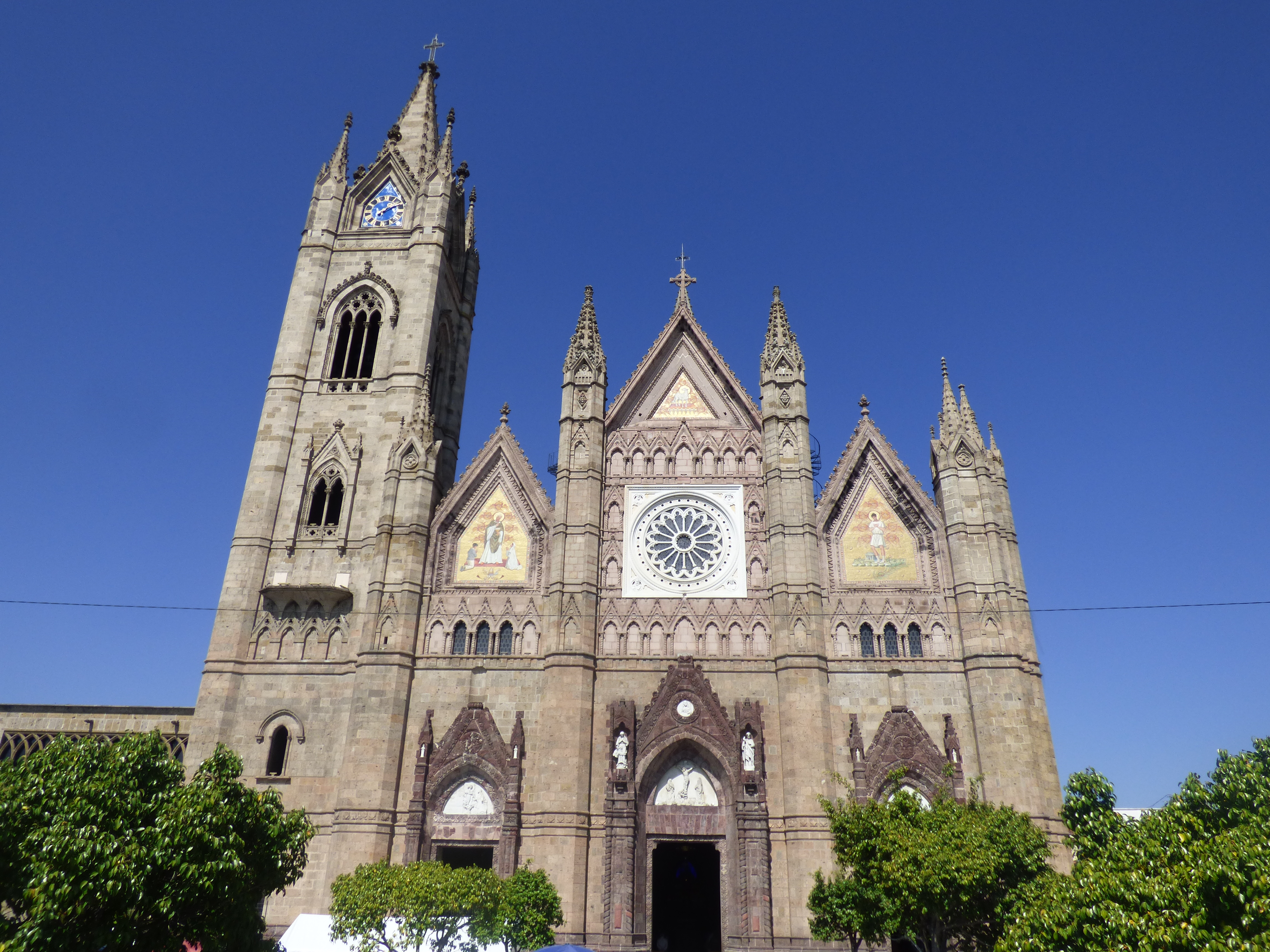
Templo Expiatorio del Santísimo Sacramento, Guadalajara, Jalisco, Mexico: 1897–1972

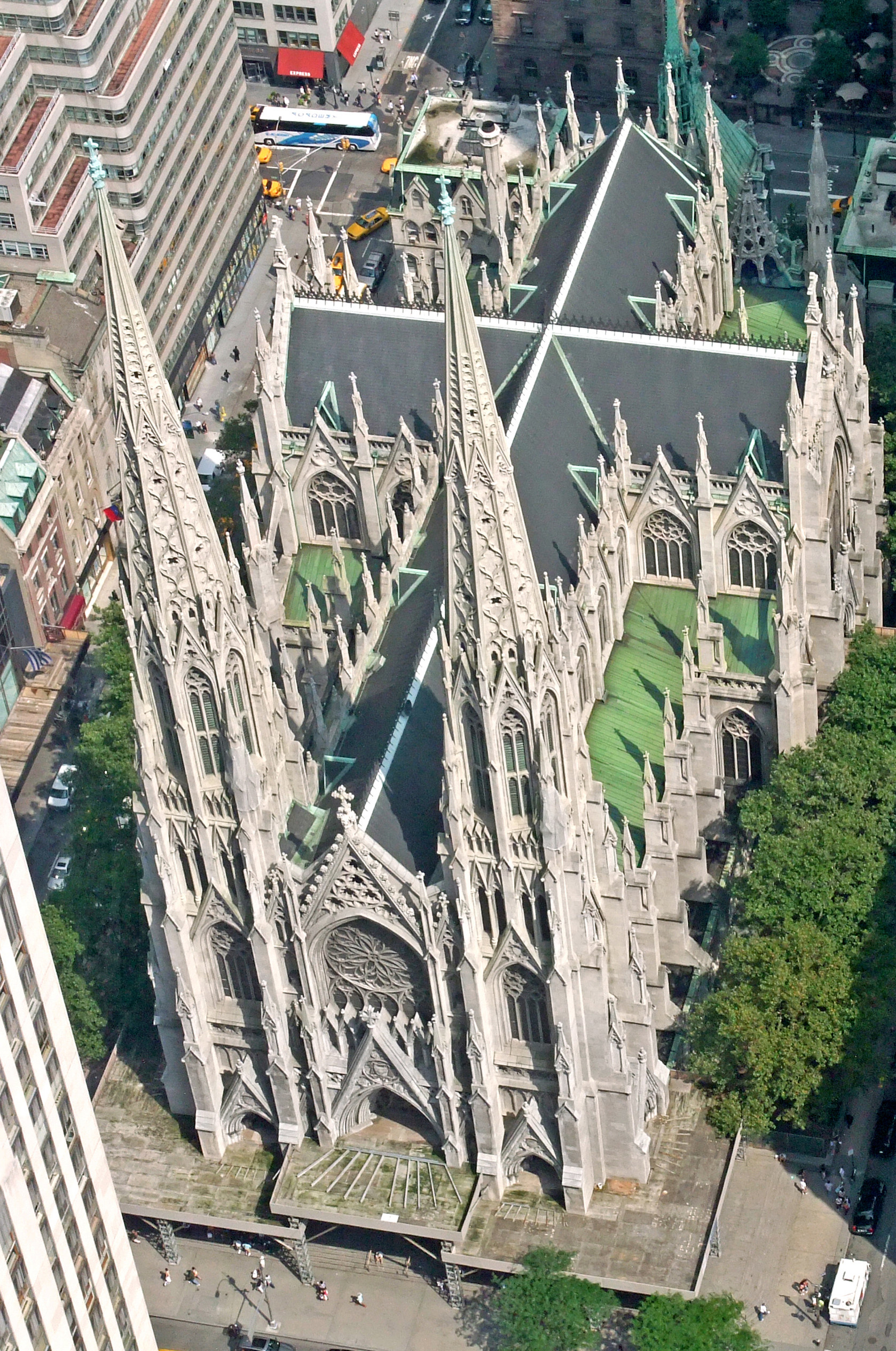
St. Patrick's Cathedral, New York, USA: 1858–1879

=== South America ===
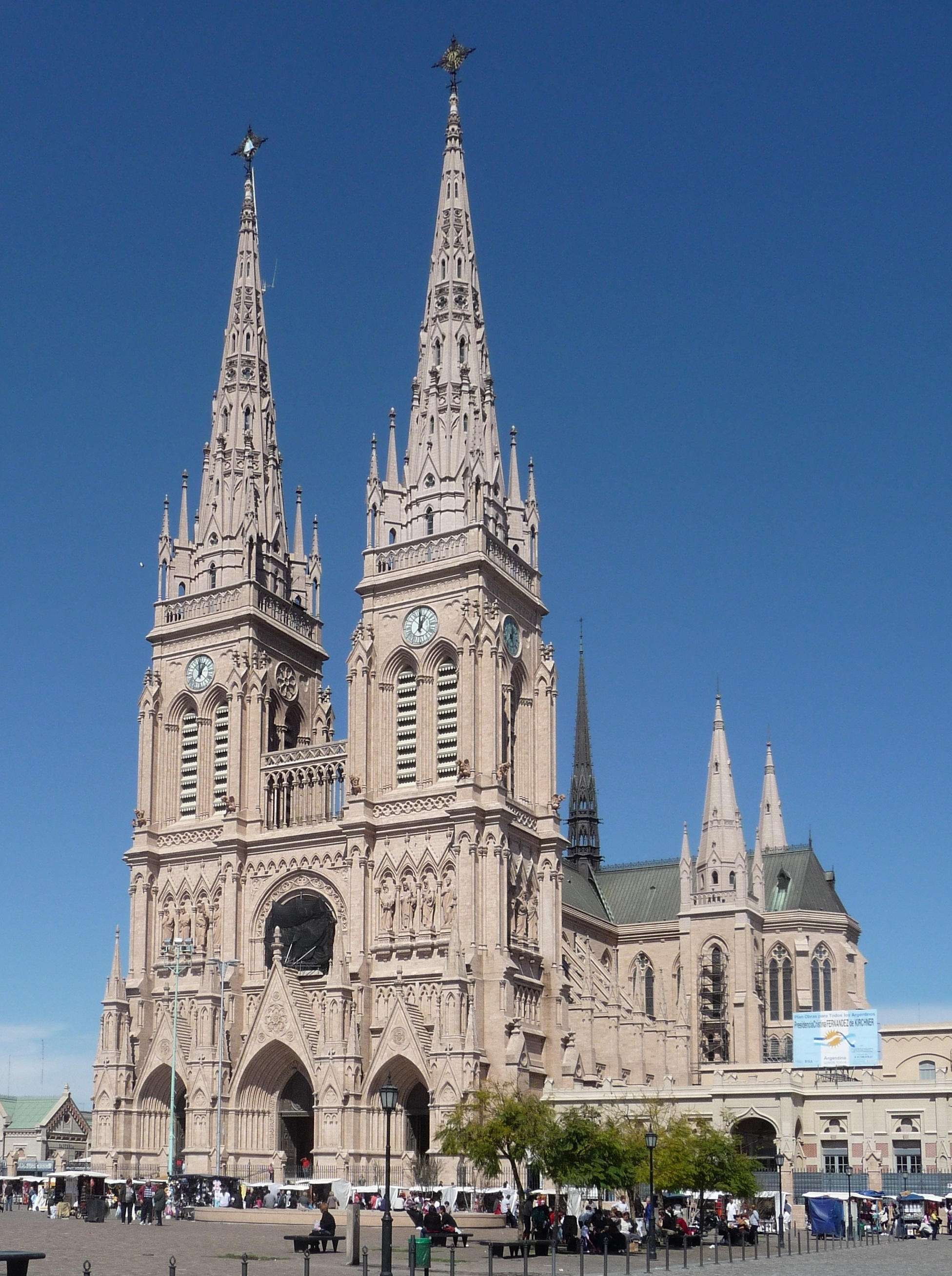
Basilica of Our Lady of Luján, Buenos Aires Province, Argentina: 1890–1935

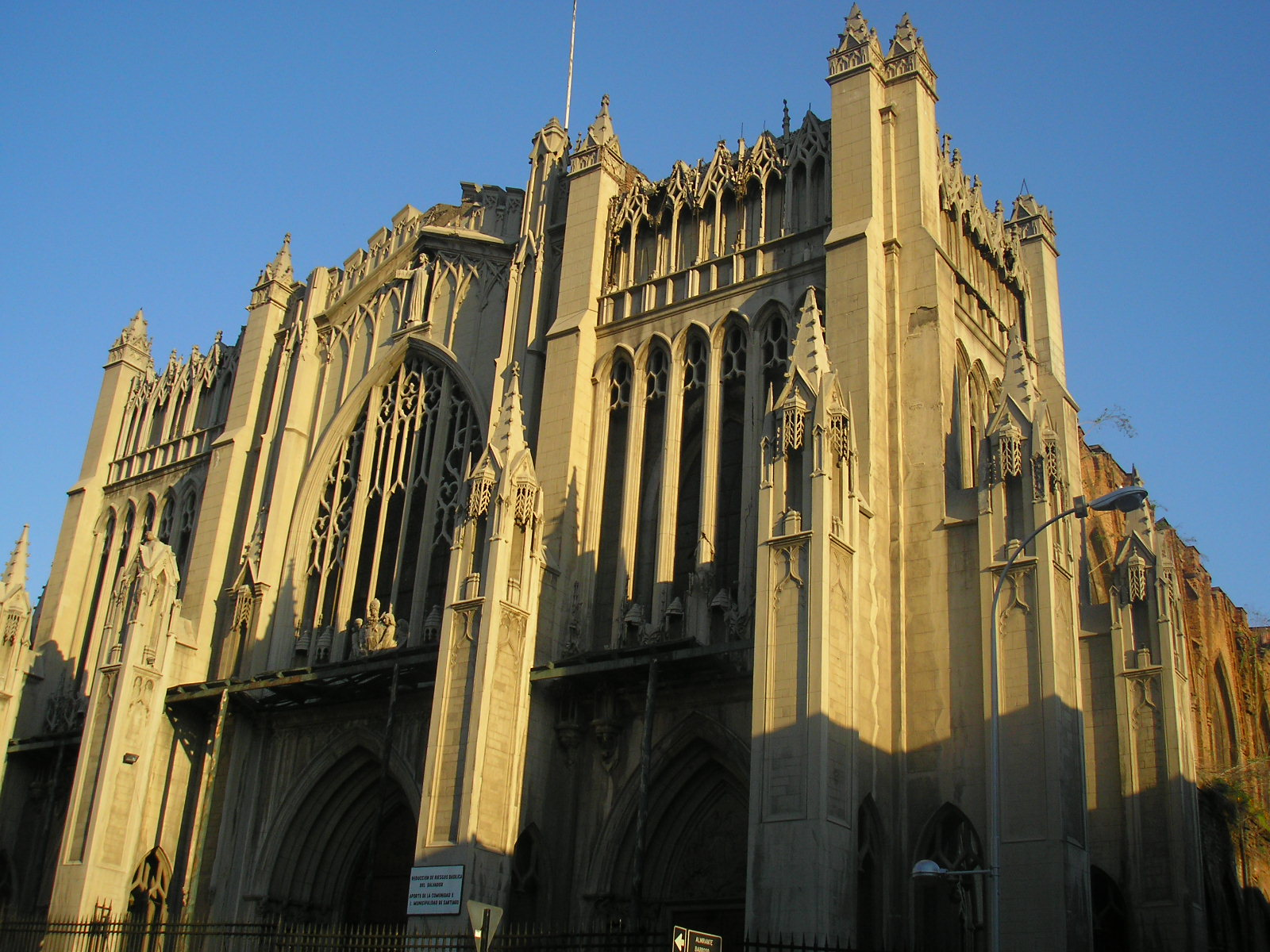
Basilica del Salvador, Santiago, Chile: 1913–1954

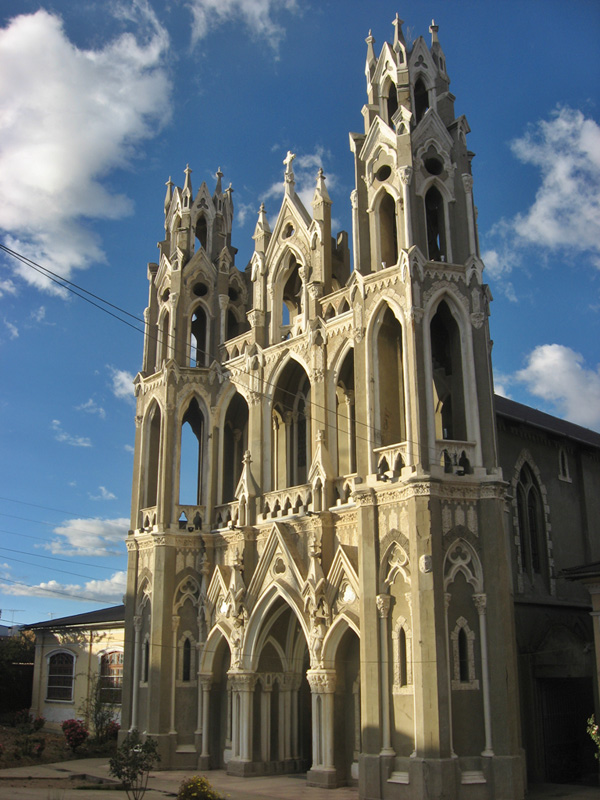
Capilla Cristo Pobre, Jauja, Peru: 1884–1925

Cathedral of Saint Peter, Guayaquil, Ecuador: 1924–1937

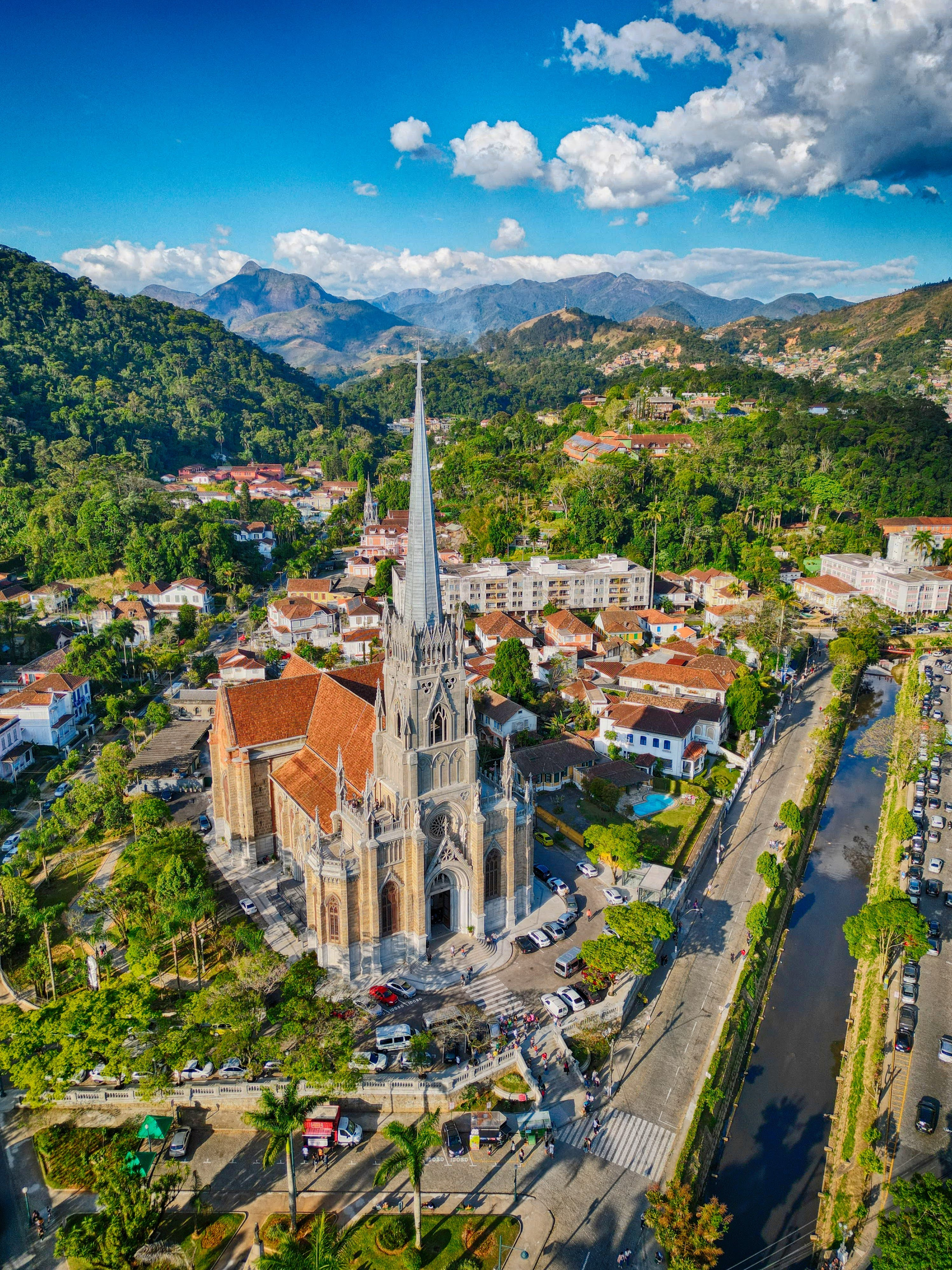
Cathedral of Saint Peter of Alcantara, Petrópolis, Brazil: 1884–1925

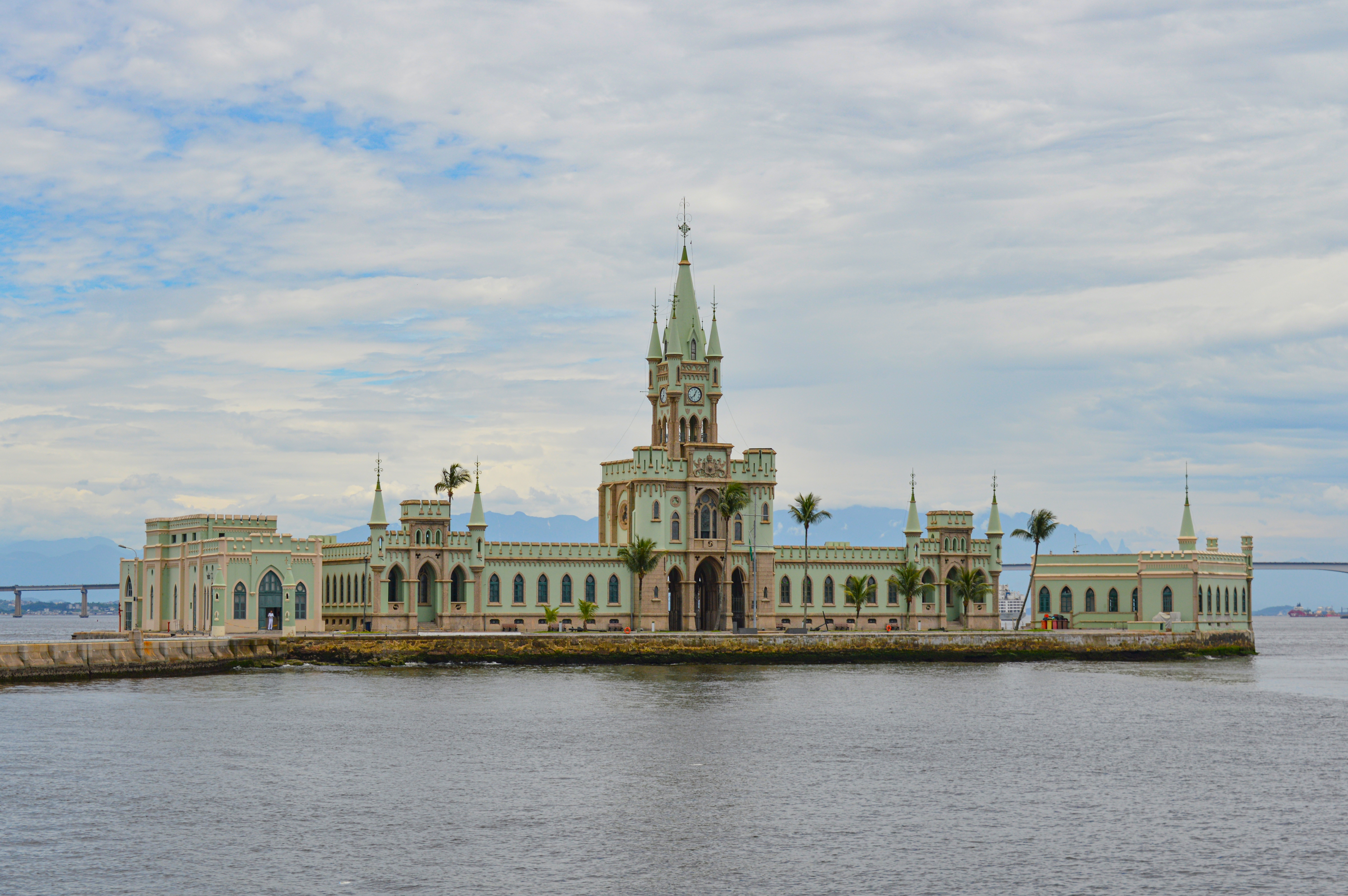
Castle of Fiscal Island, Rio de Janeiro, Brazil: 1881–1889

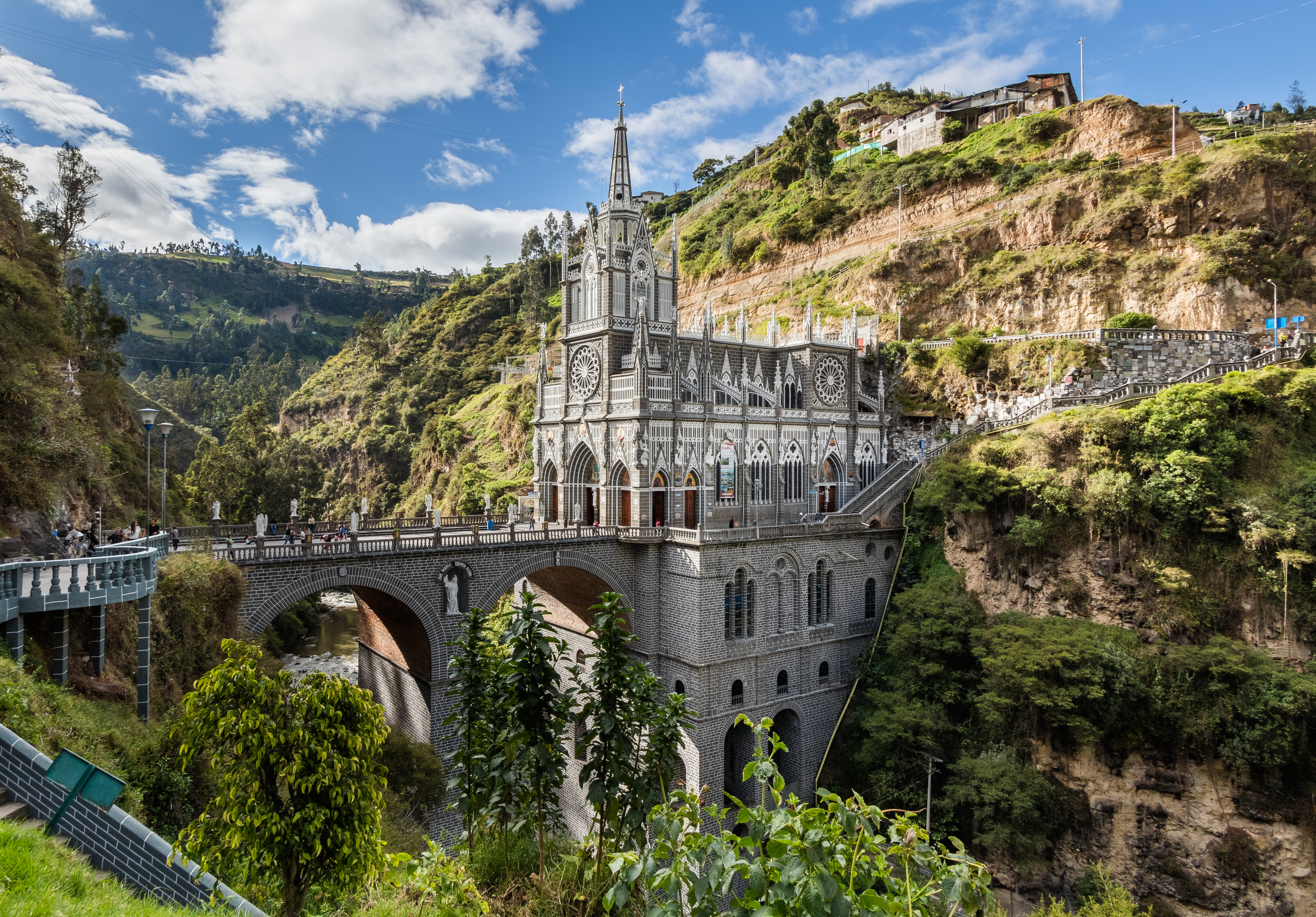
Las Lajas Sanctuary, Ipiales, Colombia: 1916–1949

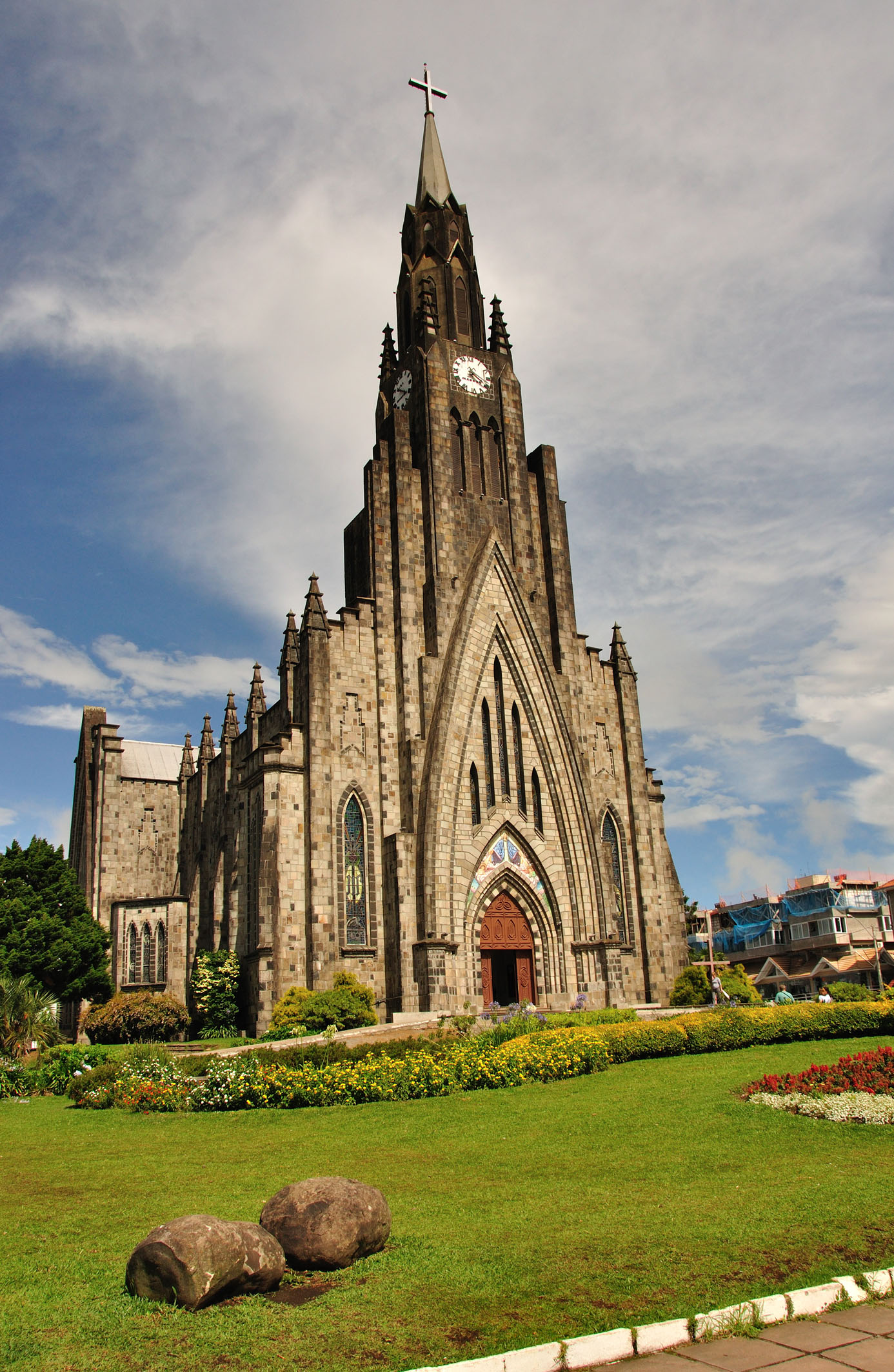
Church of Our Lady of Lourdes, Canela, Brazil: 1953–1987

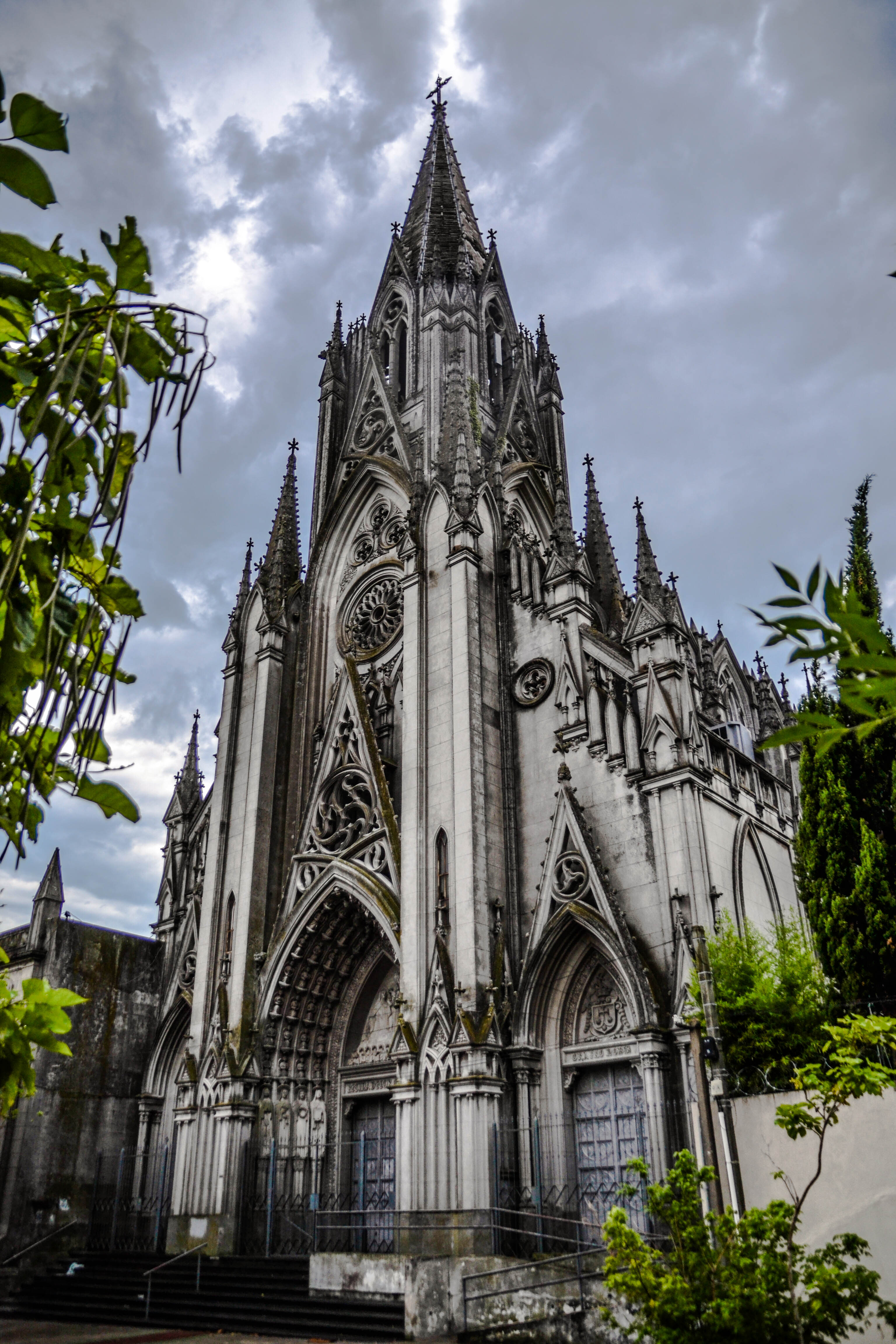
Church of the Virgin of Mount Carmel and St. Thérèse of Lisieux, Montevideo, Uruguay: 1929–1954

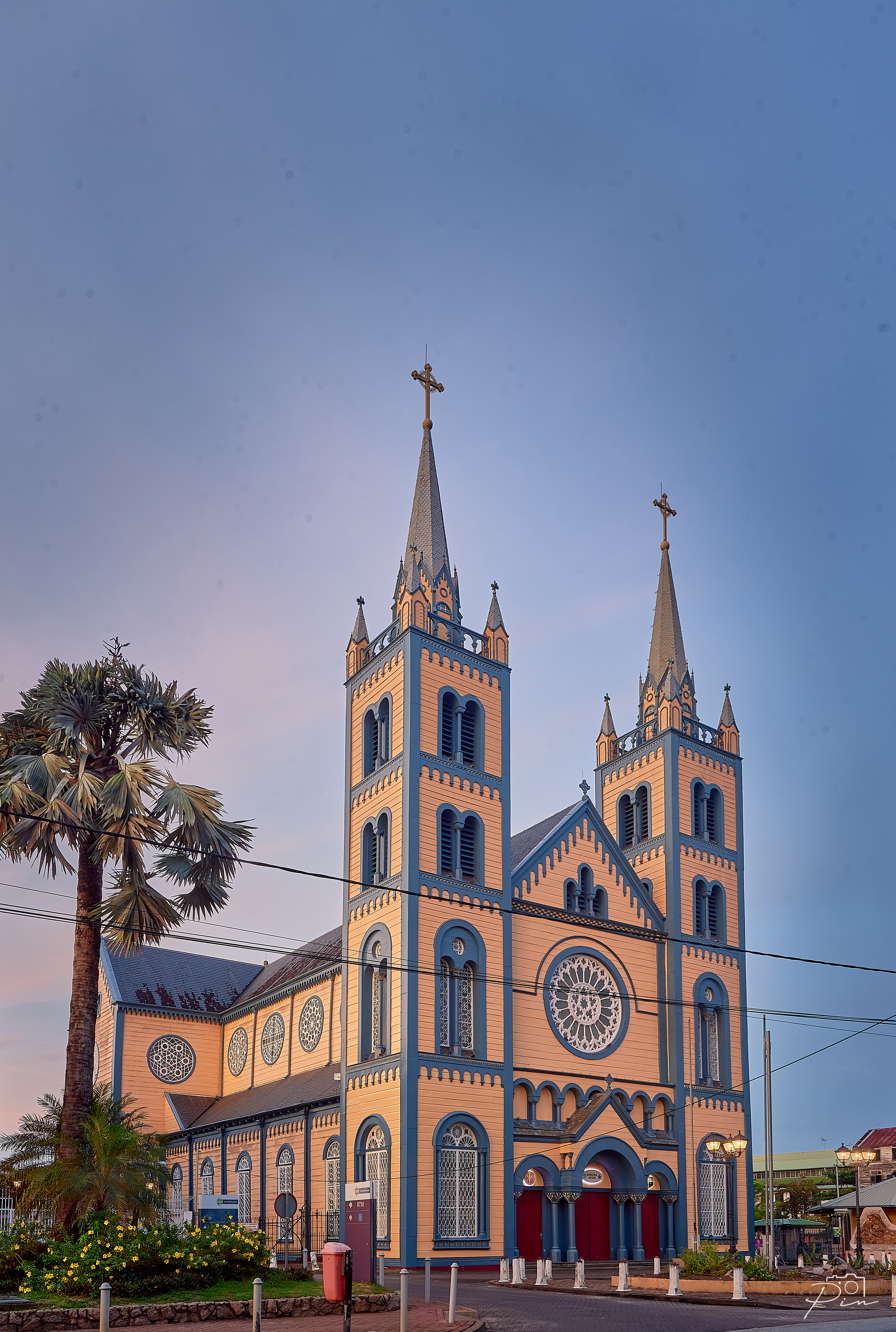
Saint Peter and Paul Cathedral, Paramaribo, Paramaribo, Suriname: 1883-1887

=== Australia and New Zealand ===
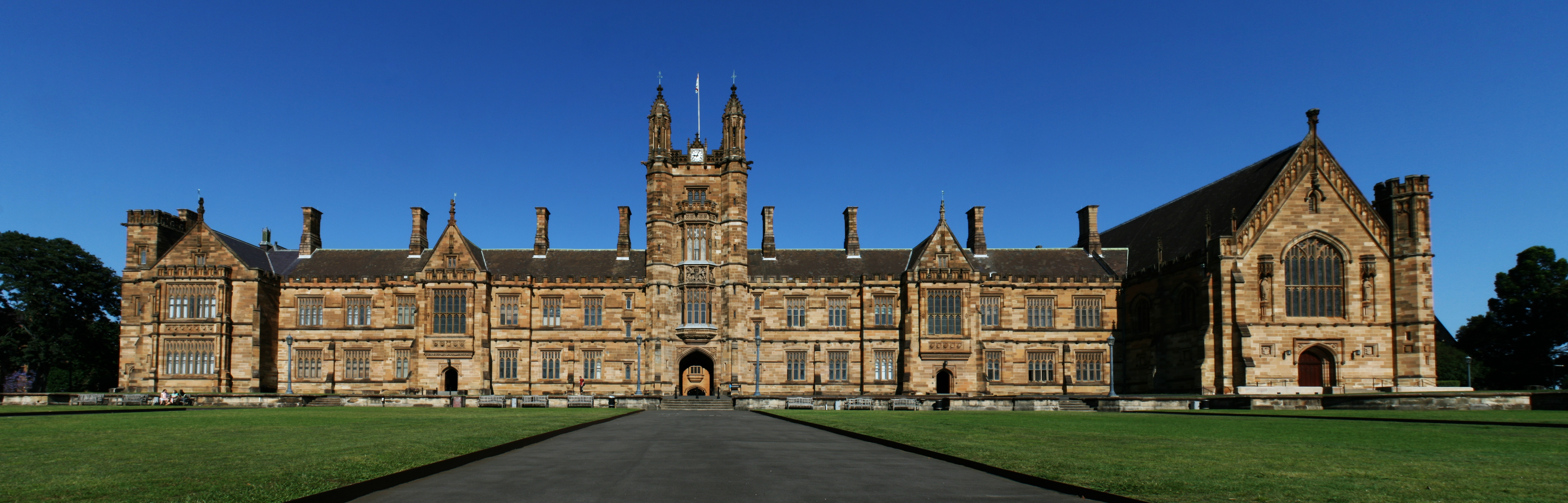
University of Sydney Quadrangle, Sydney, Australia: 1854–1862

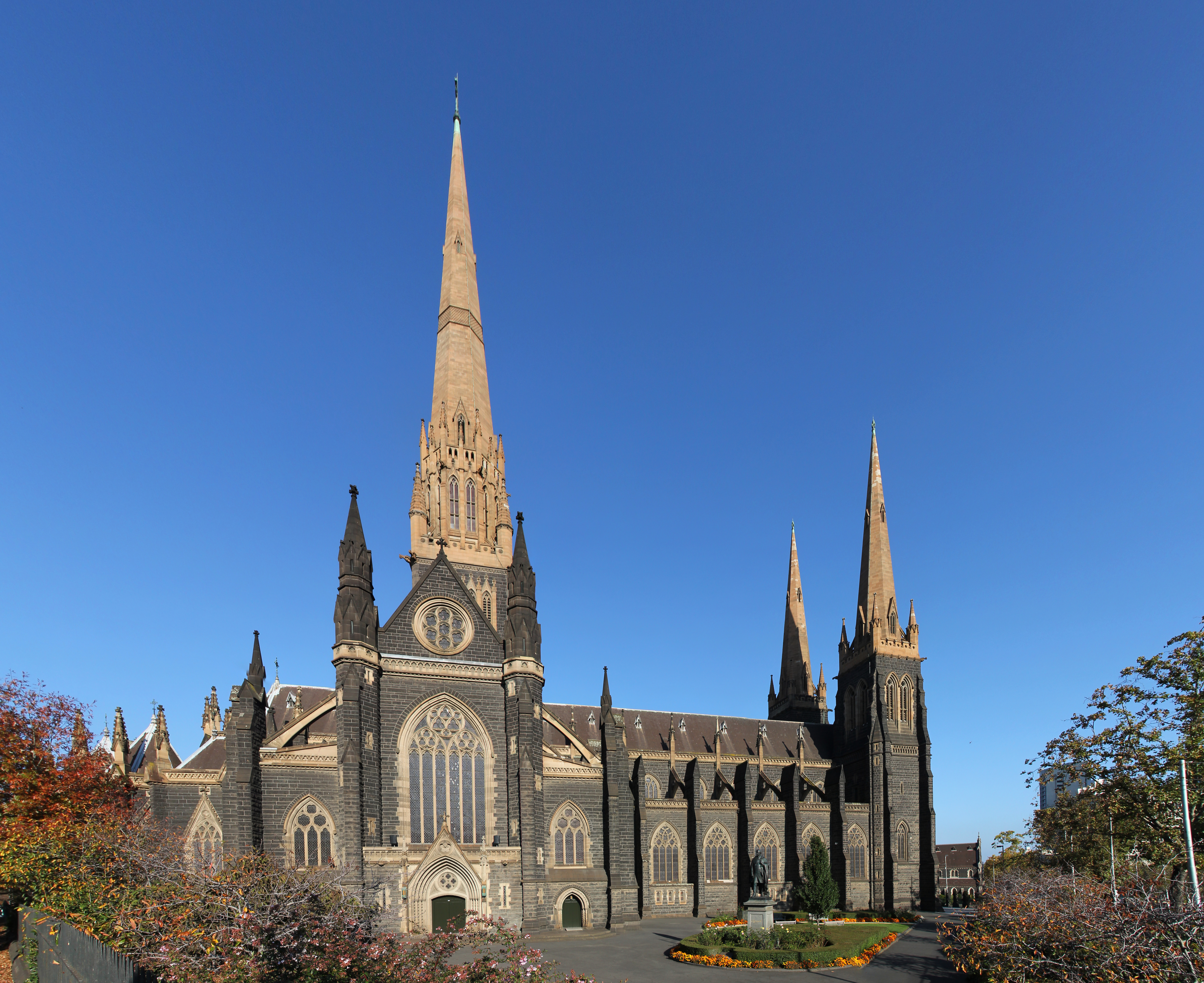
St Patrick's Cathedral, Melbourne, Australia: 1858–1939

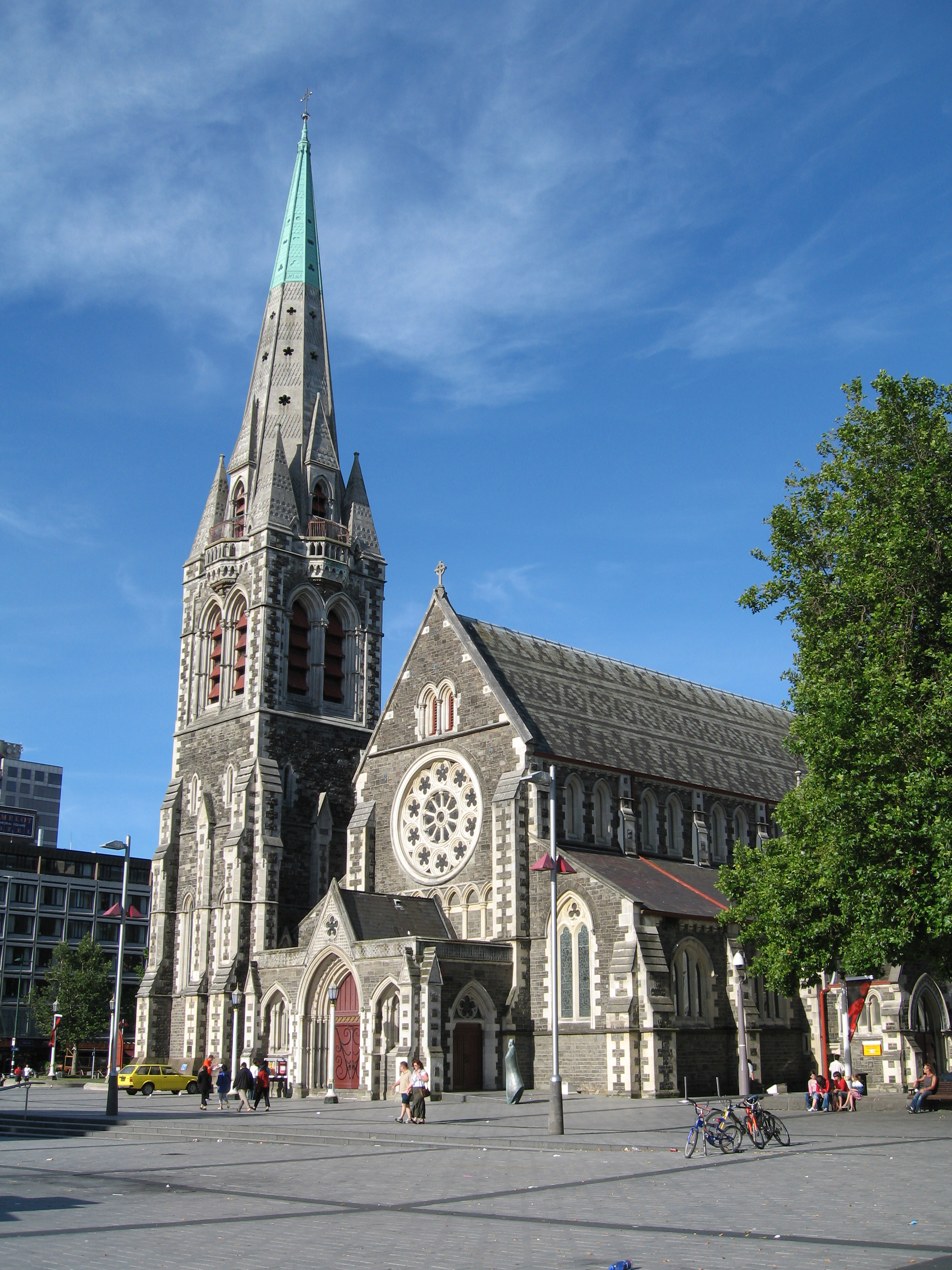
ChristChurch Cathedral, New Zealand: 1864–1904

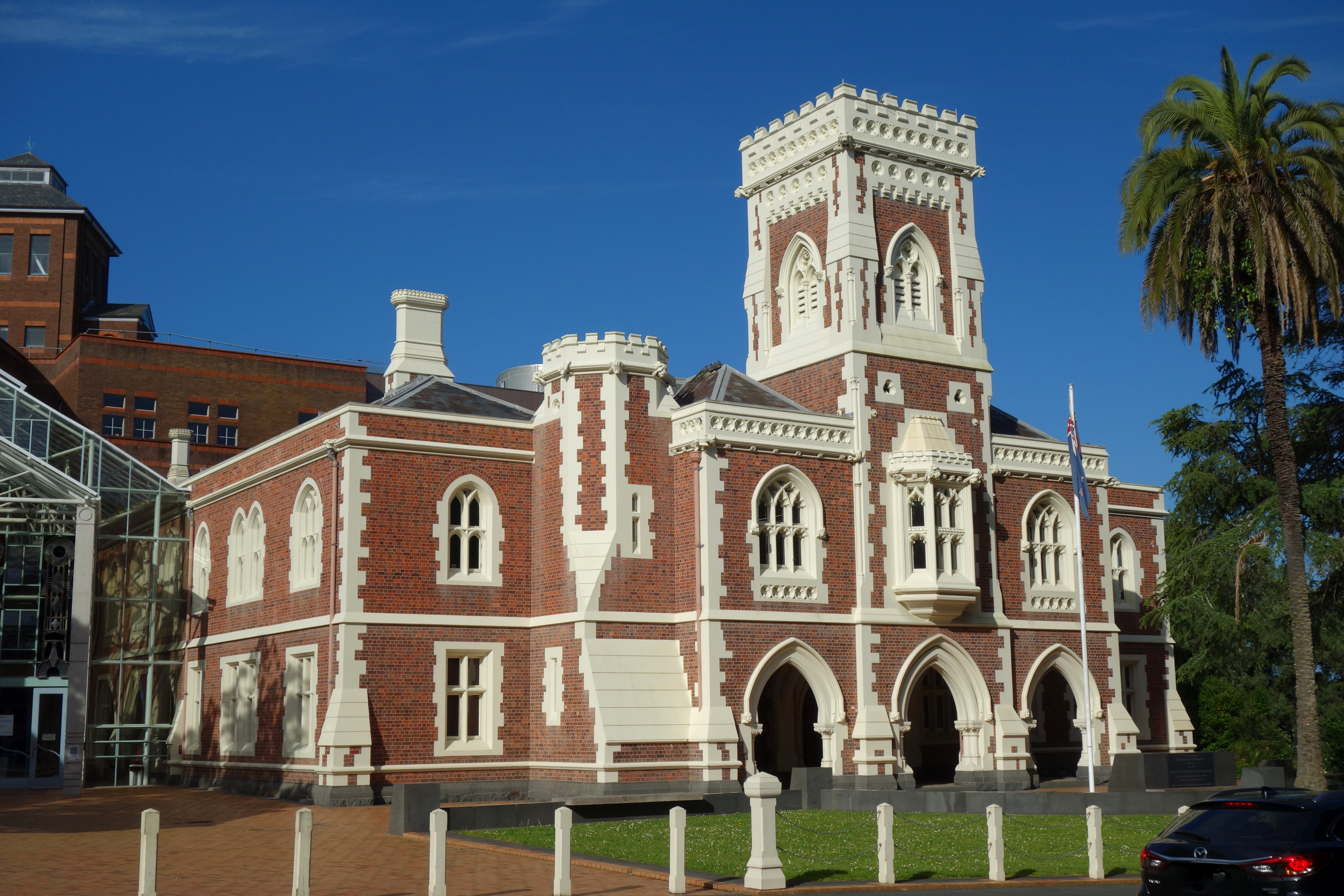
Auckland High Court, New Zealand: 1865–1867

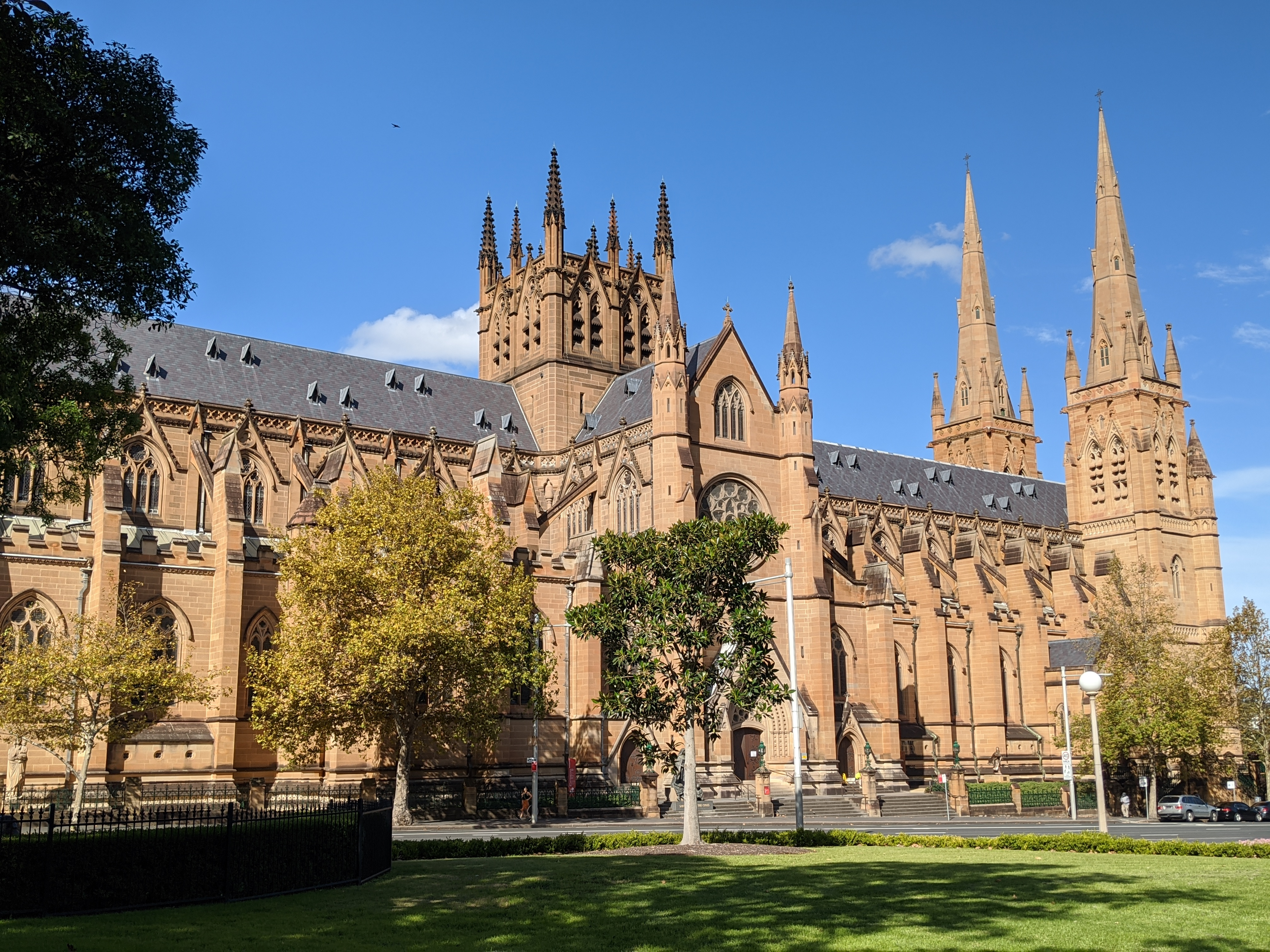
St Mary's Cathedral, Sydney, Australia: 1868–1928

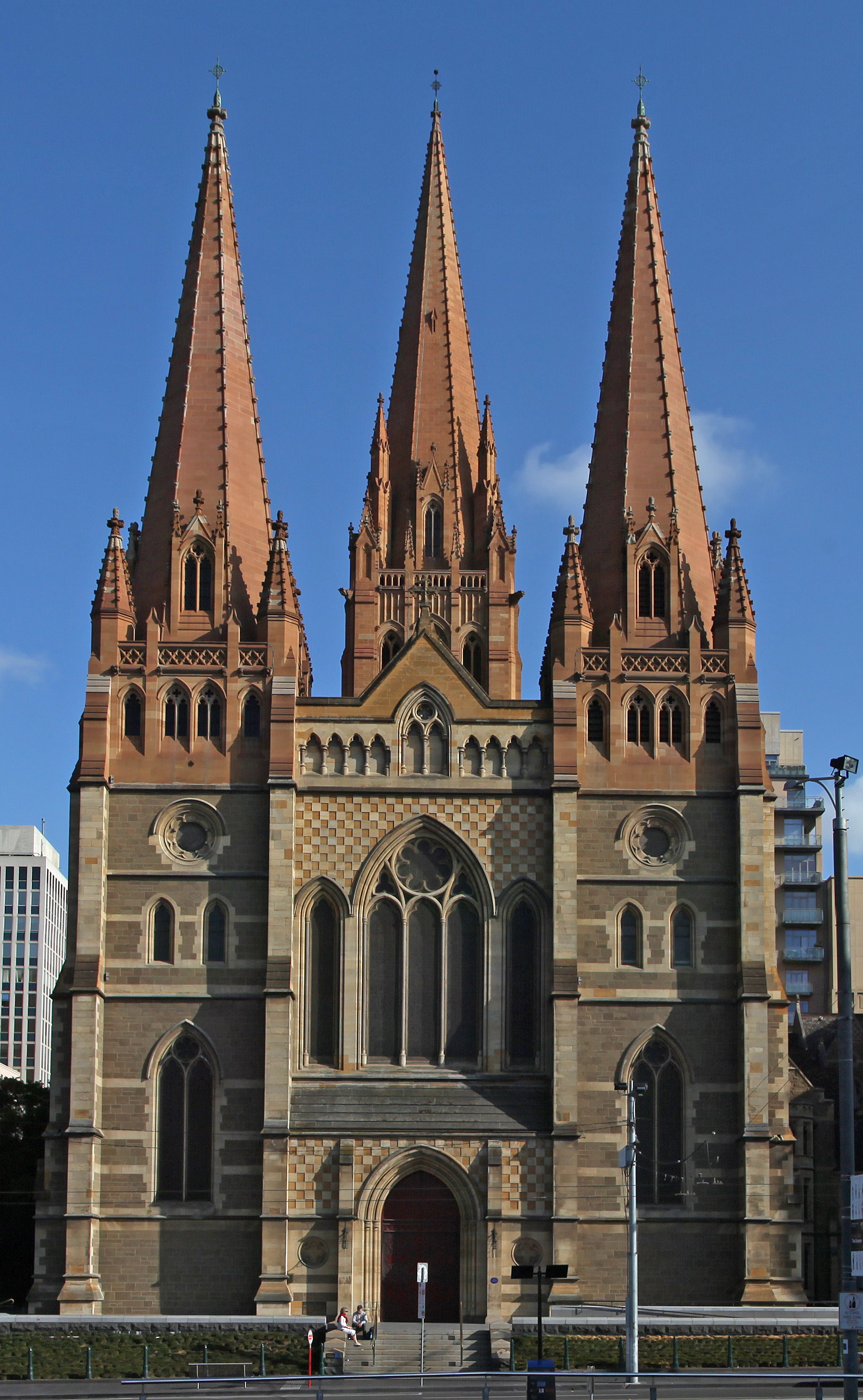
St Paul's Cathedral, Melbourne, Australia: 1880–1891

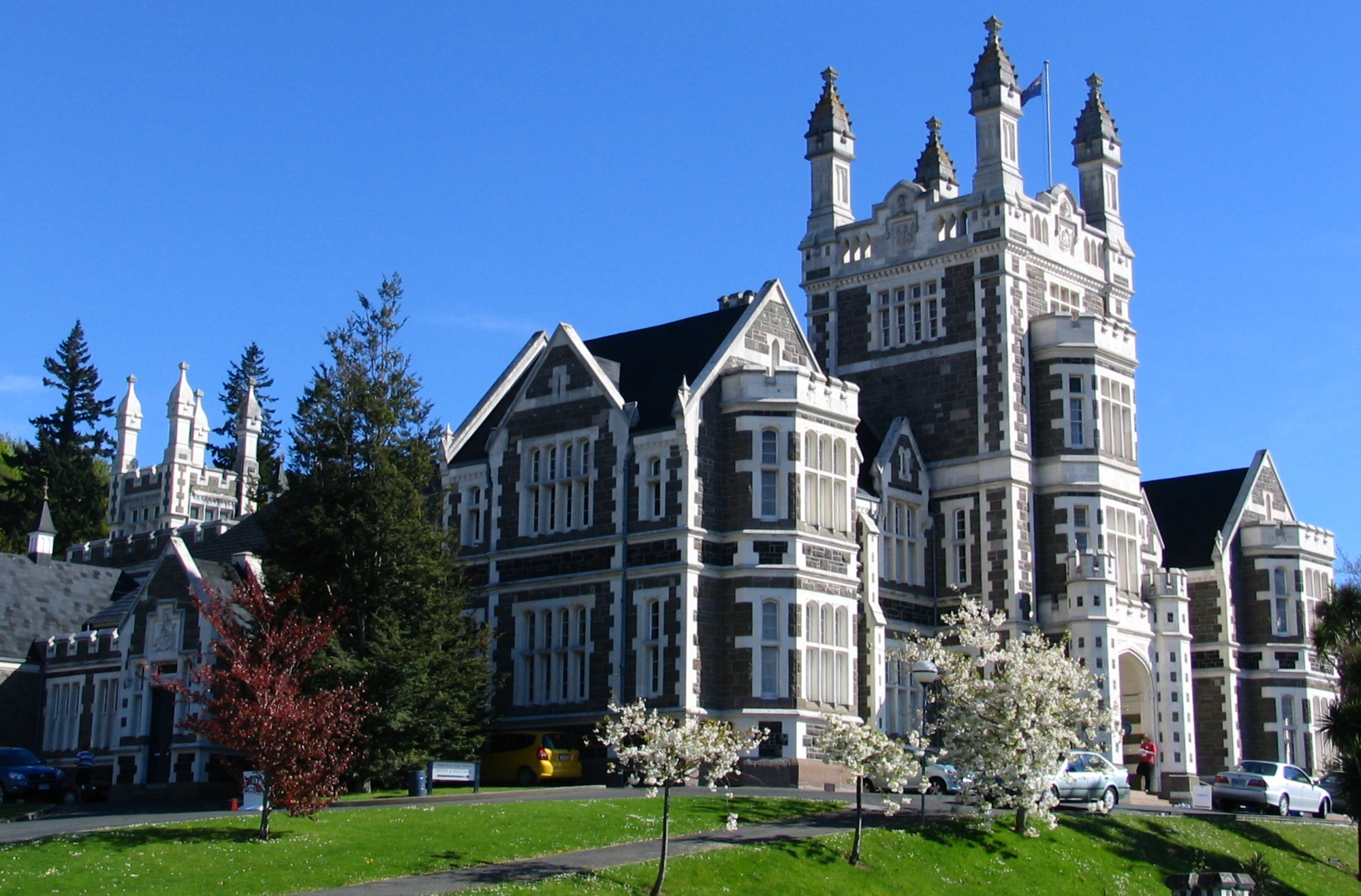
Otago Boys' High School, New Zealand: 1882–1885

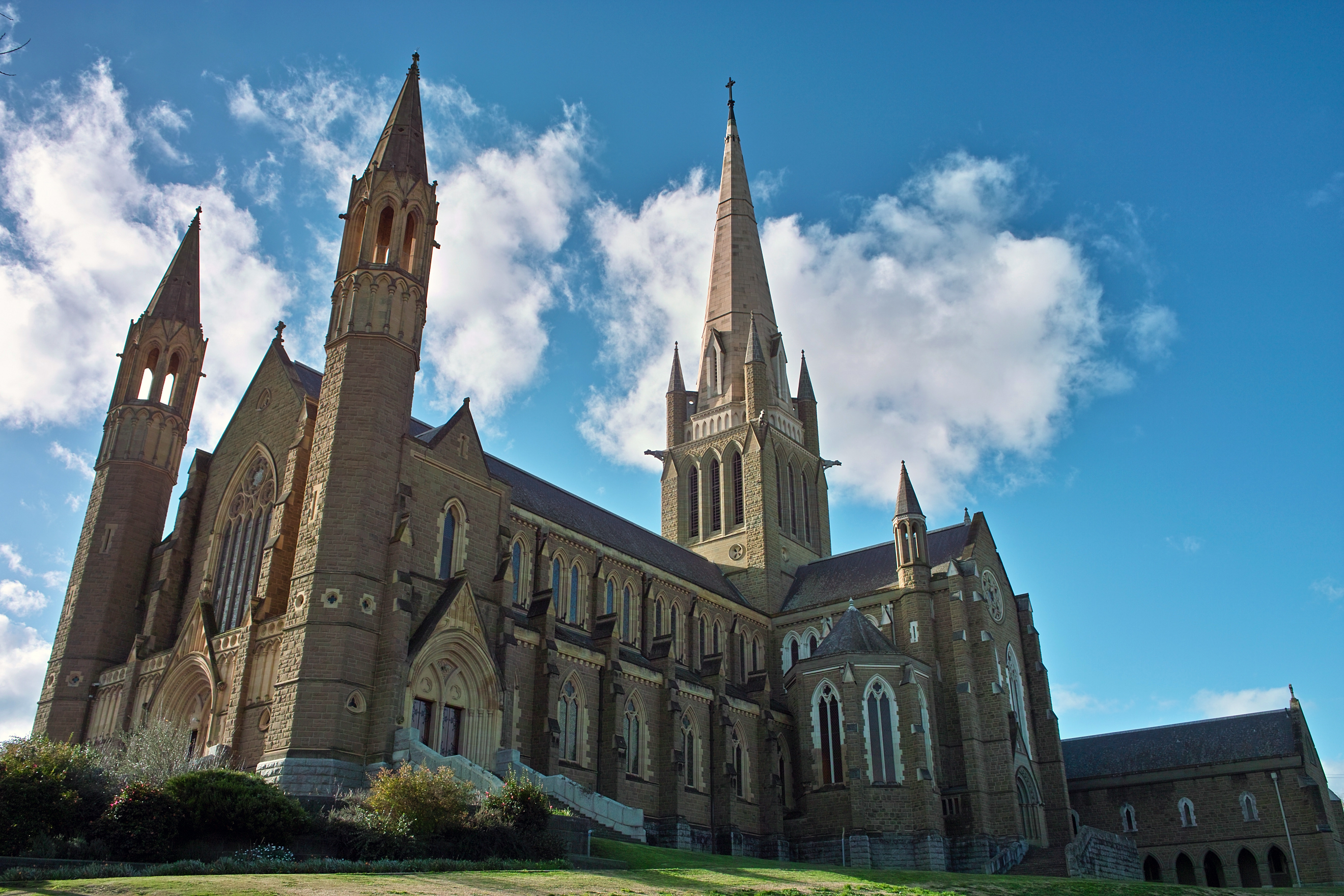
Sacred Heart Cathedral, Bendigo, Australia: 1895–1901

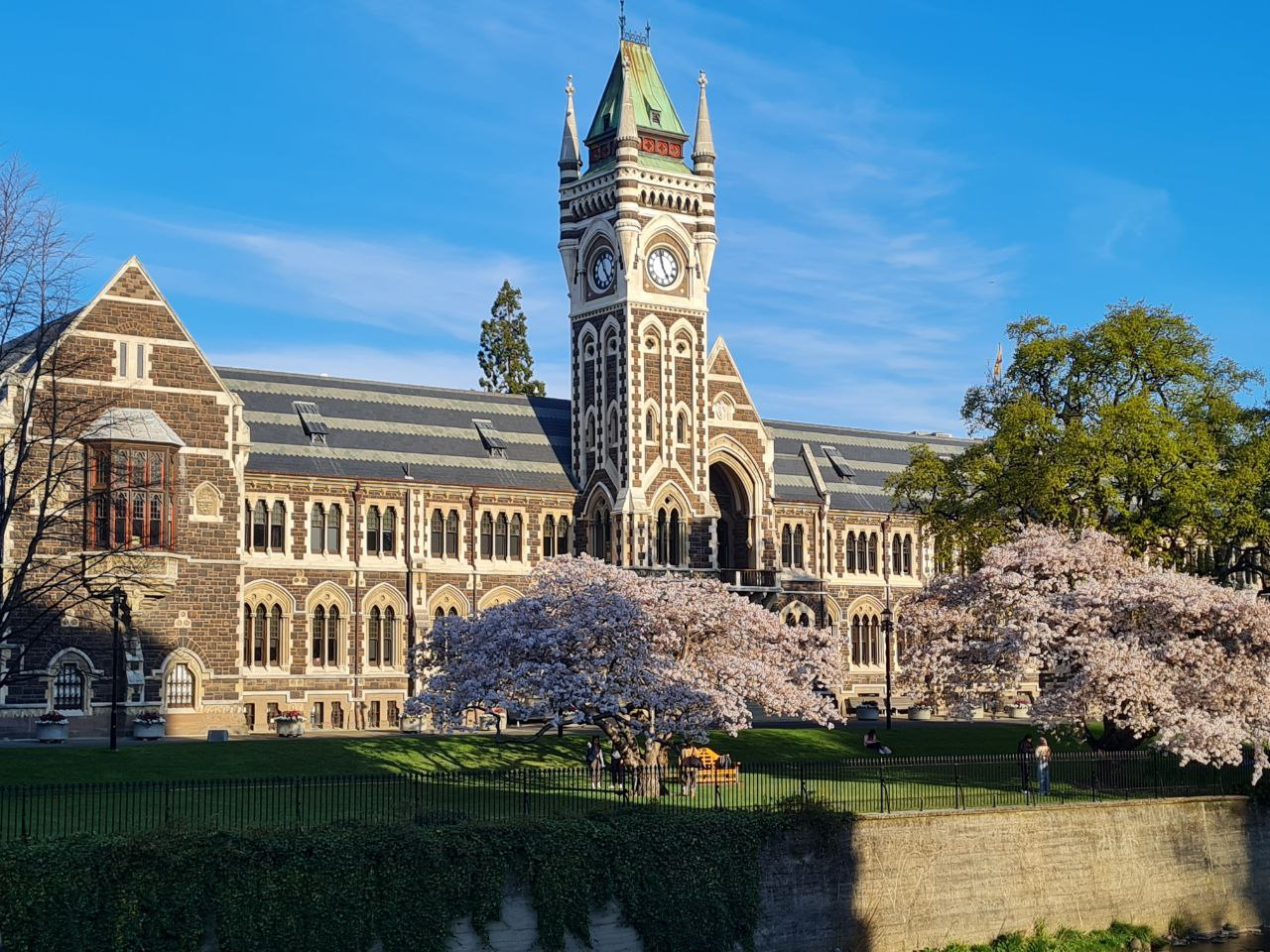
University of Otago Registry Building, New Zealand: 1878–1879

=== Asia ===
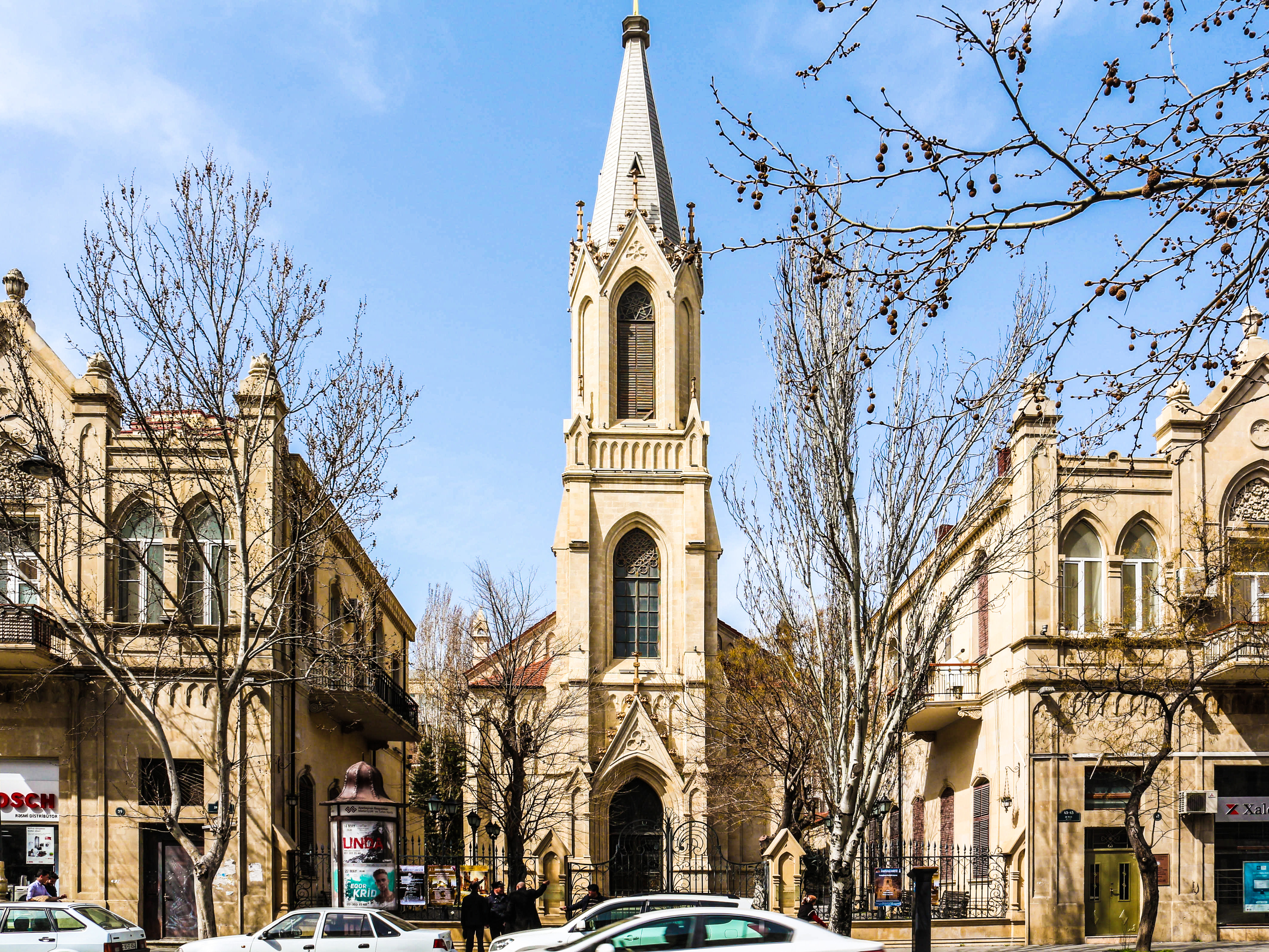
Church of the Saviour, Baku, Azerbaijan: 1896–1899

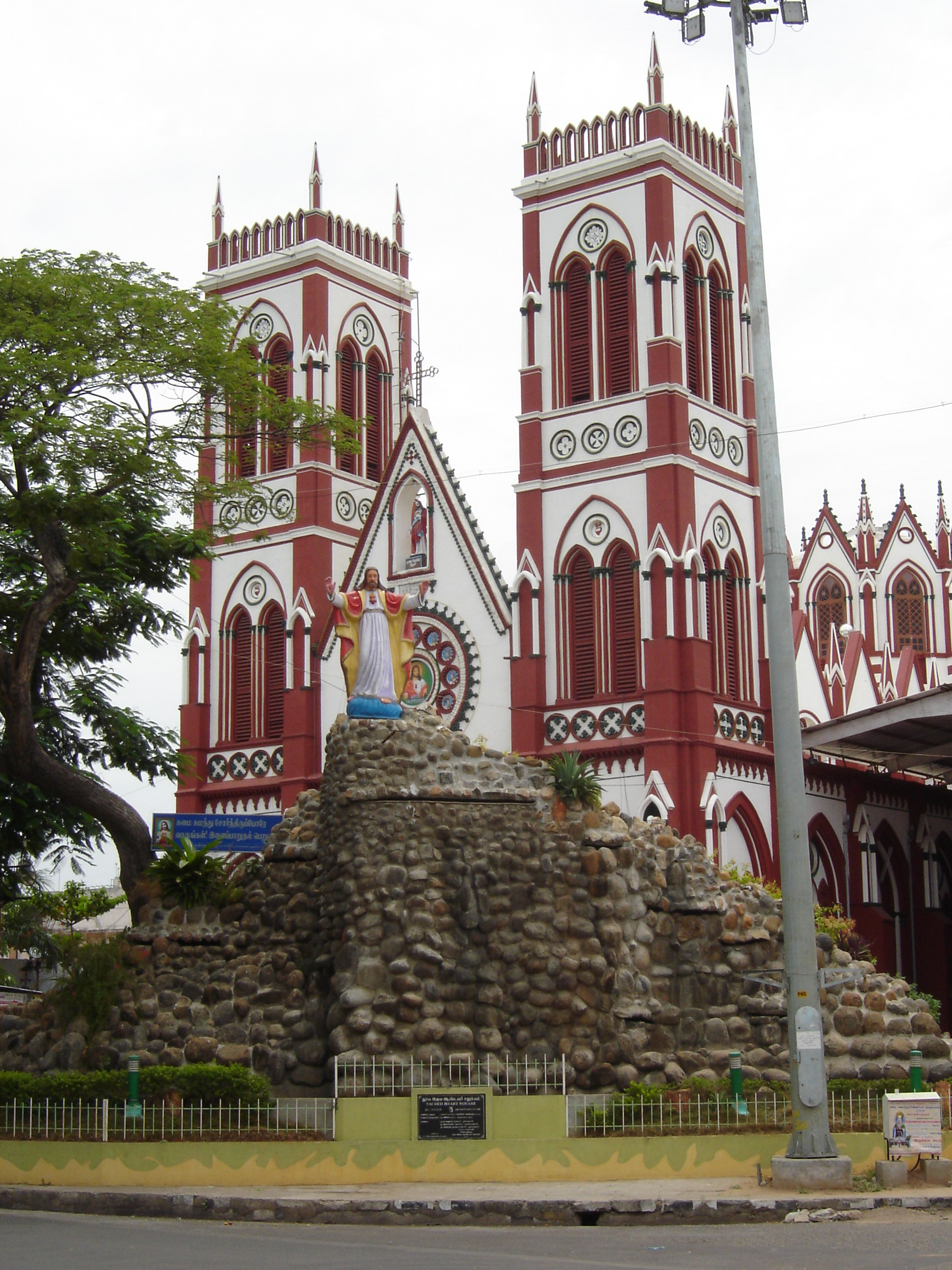
Basilica of the Sacred Heart of Jesus, Pondicherry, India: 1902–1907

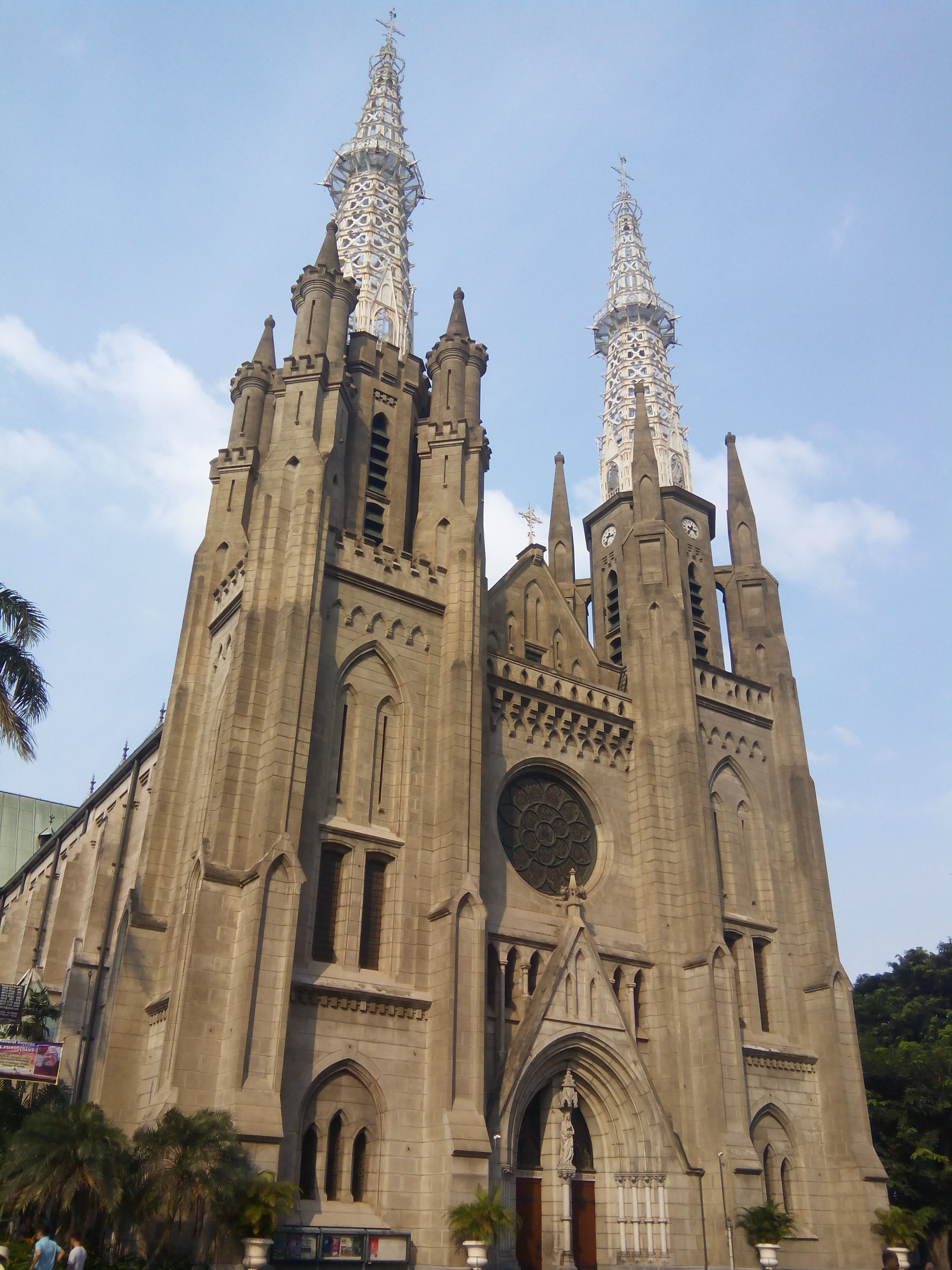
Jakarta Cathedral, Indonesia: 1891–1901

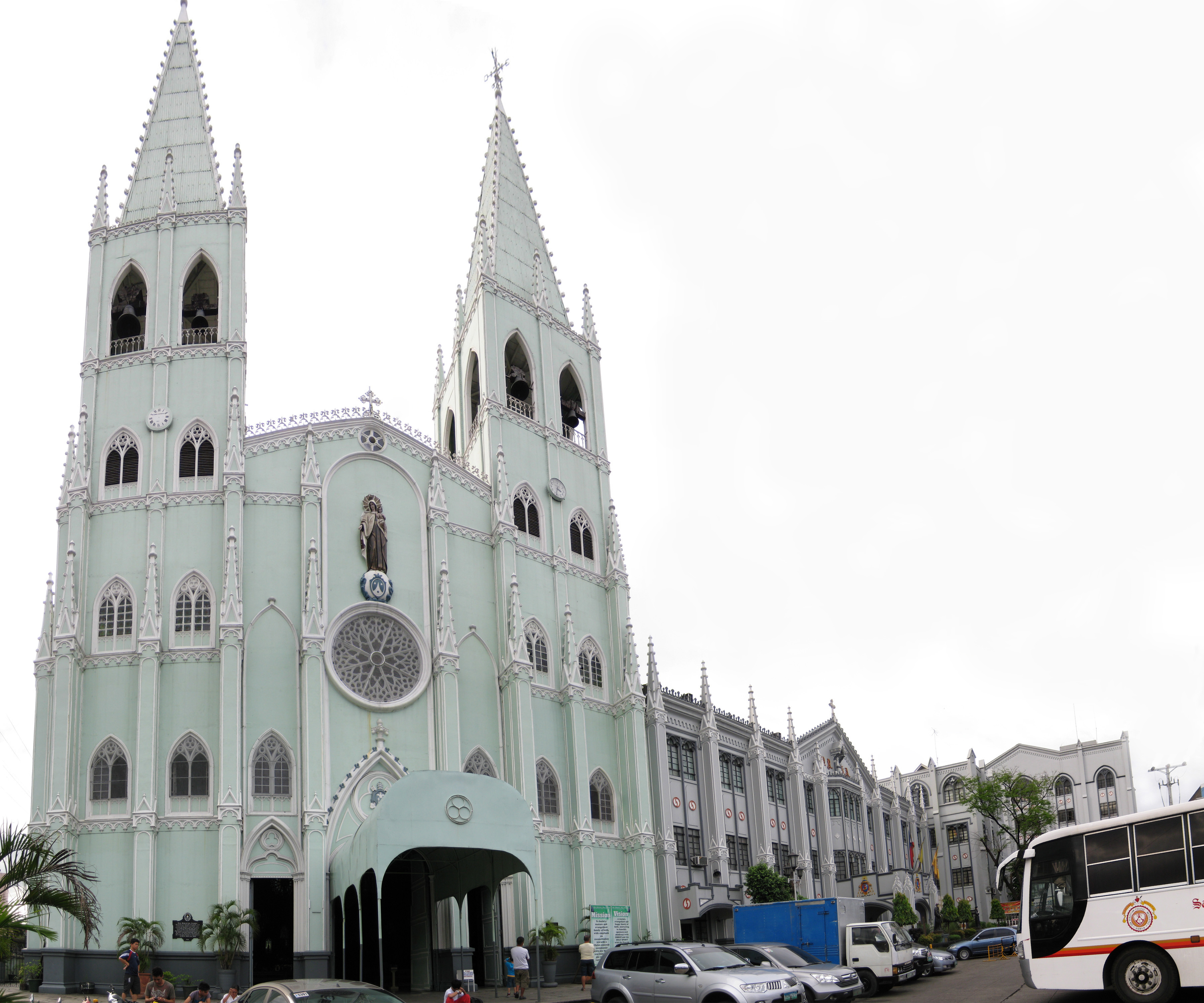
Basílica Menor de San Sebastián, Manila, Philippines: 1888–1891

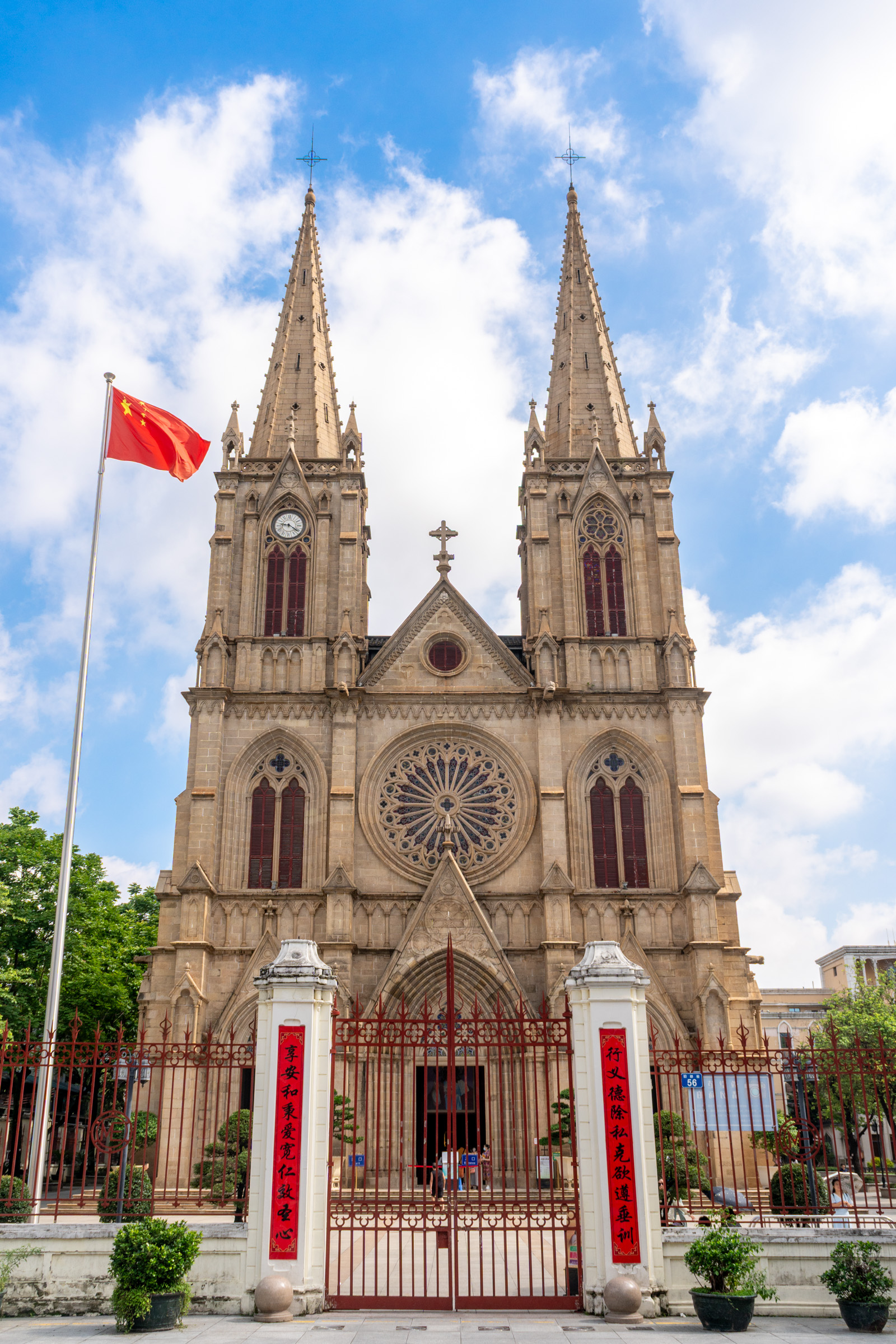
Sacred Heart Cathedral, Guangzhou, China: 1861–1888

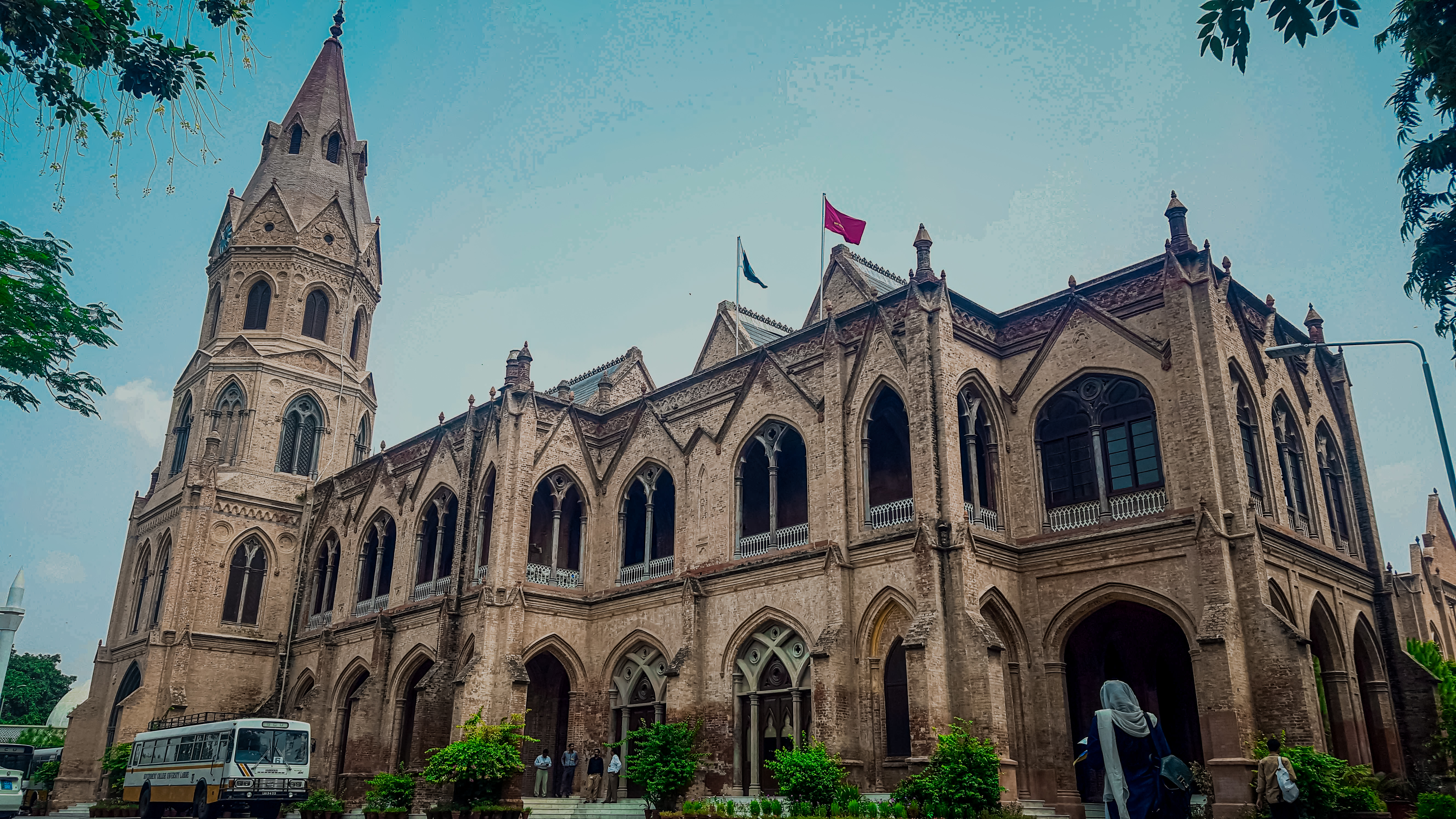
Government College University, Lahore, Pakistan: 1877

=== Decorative arts ===
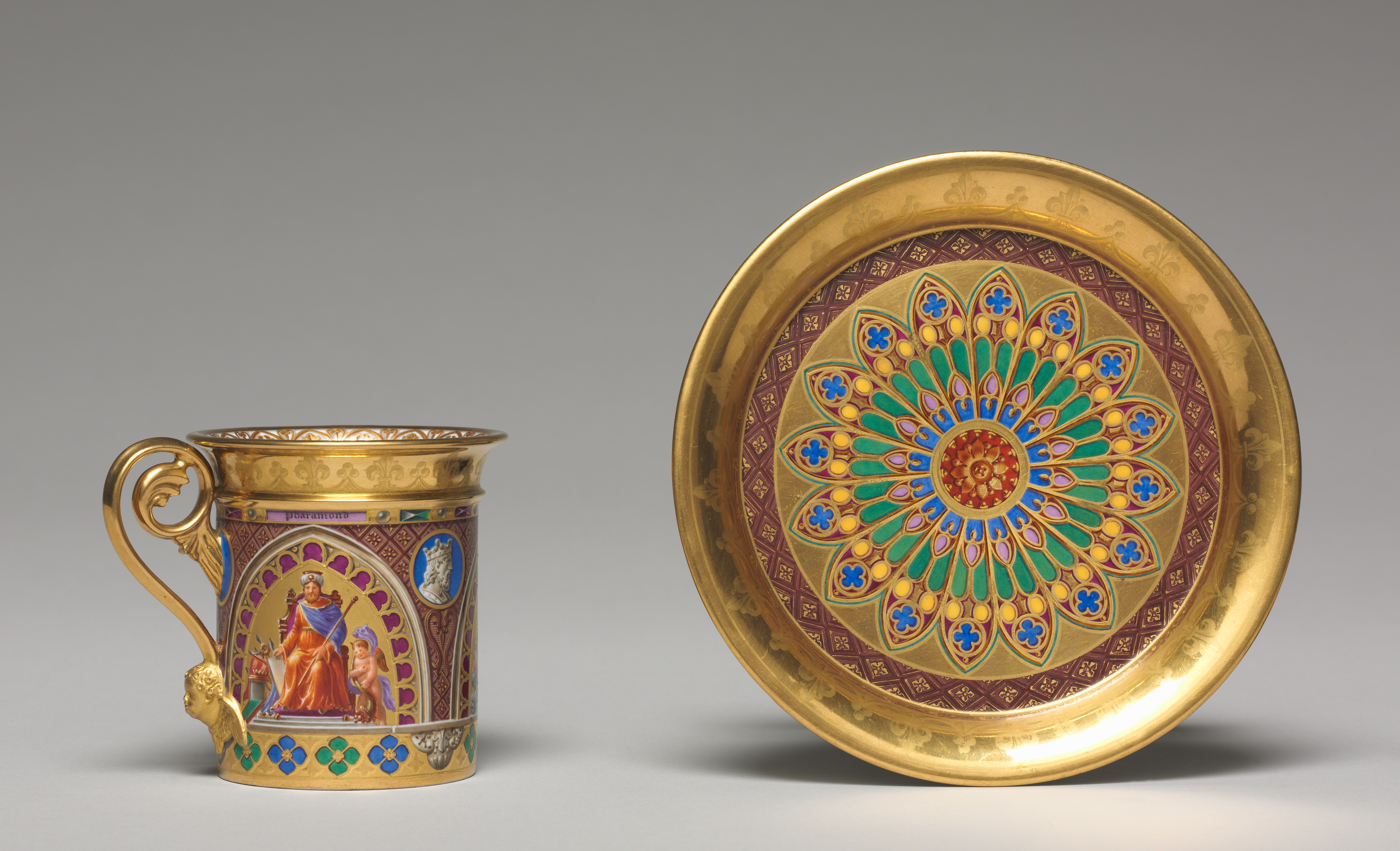
Cup and saucer, produced by the Sèvres porcelain factory and decorated by Pierre Huard, 1827, porcelain, Cleveland Museum of Art, Cleveland, Ohio, US

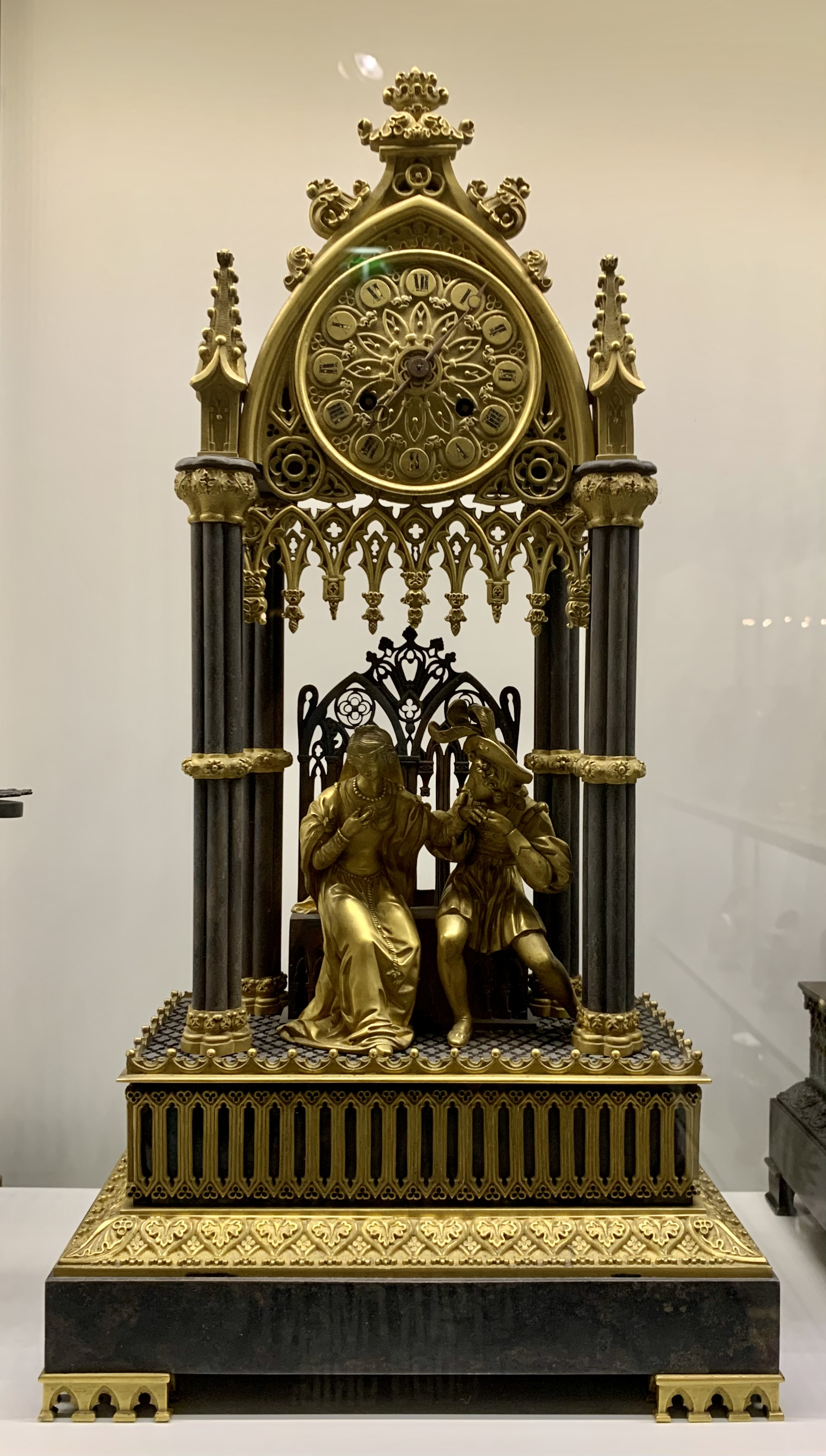
Clock, unknown French maker, c. 1835–1840, gilt and patinated bronze, Museum of Decorative Arts, Paris

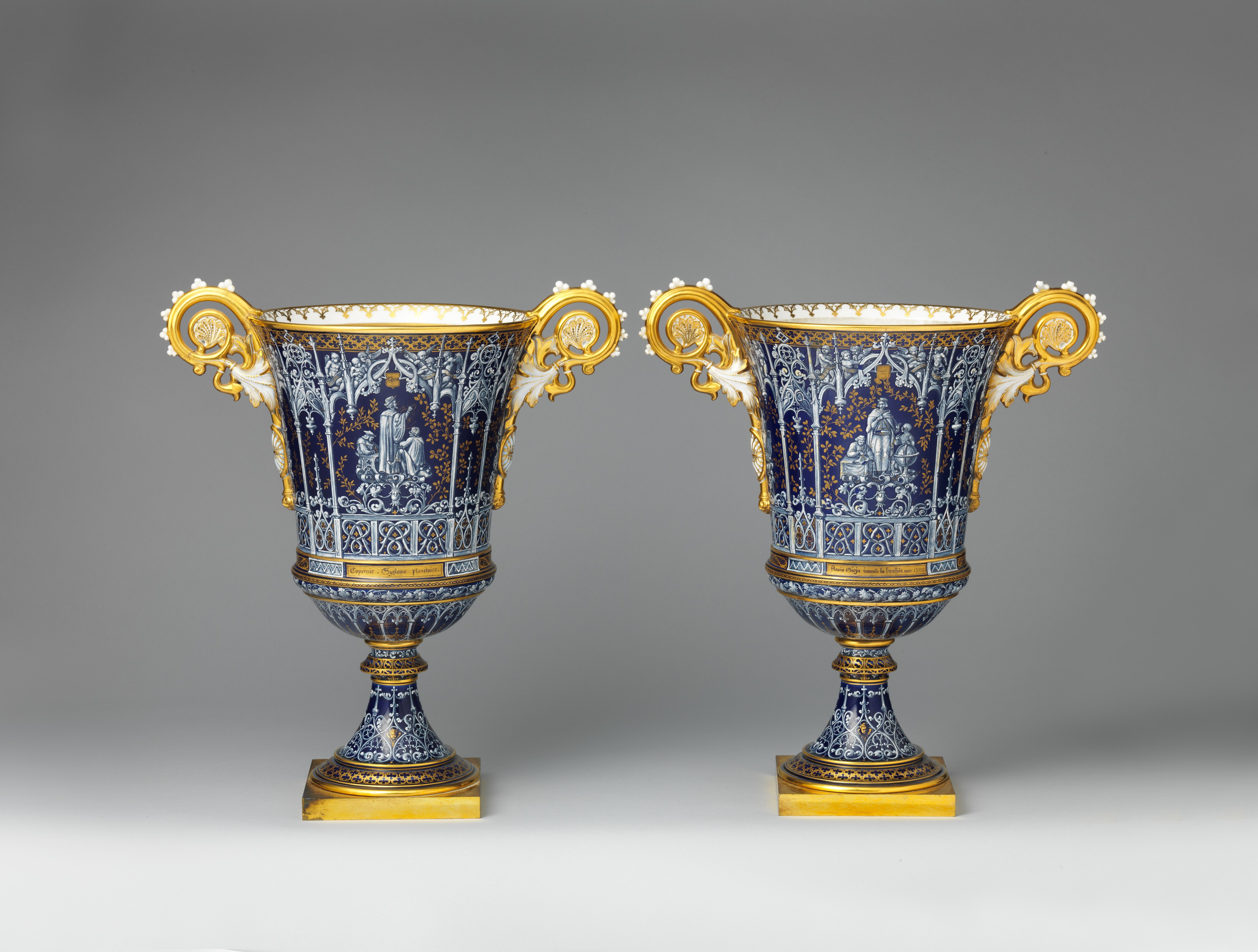
Pair of vases, by Alexandre-Évariste Fragonard and the Sèvres porcelain factory, manufactured in 1832, decorated in 1844, hard-paste porcelain, Metropolitan Museum of Art, New York City

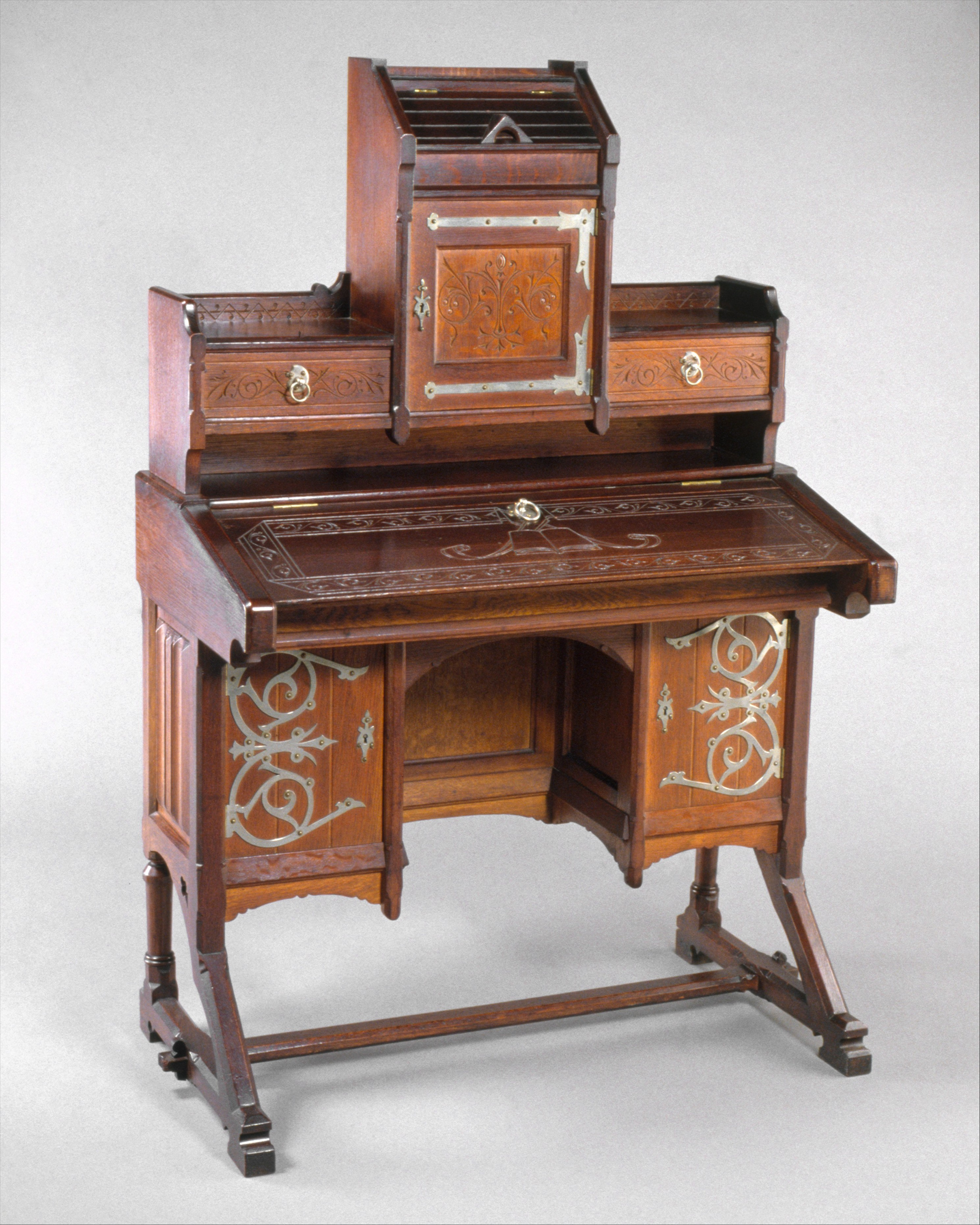
Desk, by Kimbel and Cabus, c. 1877, oak, nickel-plated brass and iron hardware, Metropolitan Museum of Art

== See also ==
=== Sub-varieties of the Gothic Revival style ===
- Black-and-White Revival – Revival of vernacular architecture
- Carpenter Gothic – North American architectural style
- Collegiate Gothic – North American architectural style
- Dissenting Gothic – Architectural style associated with English Dissenters
- National Romantic Style – Nordic architectural style
- Neo-Manueline – Style of Portuguese architecture
- High Victorian Gothic – Mid-late C19 architectural style and movement ("Ruskinian Gothic")
- Scottish Baronial – 19th-century architectural style
- Tudor Revival architecture – C19 British domestic building style

=== Locale ===
- Gothic Revival architecture in Canada
- List of Gothic Revival architecture
- Gothic Revival architecture in Poland

== Sources ==
- Aldrich, Megan Brewster; Atterbury, Paul (1995). A.W.N. Pugin: Master of Gothic Revival. New Haven and London: Yale University Press. ISBN 978-0-300-06656-2.
- Aldrich, Megan (2005). Gothic Revival. London: Phaidon Press. ISBN 978-0-714-83631-7.
- — (2019). Megan Aldrich; Alexandrina Buchanan (eds.). Thomas Rickman and the Victorians. Studies in Victorian Architecture and Design. Vol. 7. London: The Victorian Society. ISBN 978-0-901-65756-5. OCLC 1088560920.
- Anstruther, Ian (1963). The Knight and the Umbrella: An Account of the Eglinton Tournament – 1839. London: Geoffrey Bles. OCLC 249701828.
- Atterbury, Paul; Wainwright, Clive (1994). Pugin: A Gothic Passion. New Haven and London: Yale University Press. ISBN 978-0-300-06656-2. OCLC 750811794.
- Bartlett, Robert (2001). Medieval Panorama. Los Angeles: Getty Publications. ISBN 978-0-892-36642-2.
- Beard, Geoffrey (1985). The National Trust Book of English Furniture. London: Viking. ISBN 978-0-670-80141-1. OCLC 924269530.
- Bradley, Simon (2007). St Pancras Station. London: Profile Books. ISBN 978-1-861-97951-3.
- Brichta, Tomas (2014). Late Completion of Cologne and St-Vitus Cathedral (M.Arch). University of Edinburgh. hdl:1842/9814.
- Brooks, Alan; Pevsner, Nikolaus (2007). Worcestershire. The Buildings of England. Yale University Press. ISBN 978-0-300-11298-6.
- Buggeln, Gretchen Townsend (2003). Temples of Grace: The Material Transformation of Connecticut's Churches. Hanover, US: New England University Publications. ISBN 978-1-584-65322-6.
- Chadenet, Sylvie (2001). French Furniture: From Louis XIII to Art Deco. Boston, US: Little, Brown and Company. ISBN 978-0-821-22683-4.
- Chalcraft, Anna; Viscardi, Judith (2007). Strawberry Hill: Horace Walpole's Gothic Castle. London: Frances Lincoln Ltd. ISBN 978-0-711-22687-6. OCLC 255611525.
- Charlesworth, Michael (2002). The Gothic Revival 1720–1870 – Literary Sources and Documents: Blood and Ghosts. Vol. 1. Robertsbridge, East Sussex: Helm Information. ISBN 978-1-873-40367-9. OCLC 491489502.
- — (2002). The Gothic Revival 1720–1870 – Literary Sources and Documents: Gothic and National Architecture. Vol. 3. Robertsbridge, East Sussex: Helm Information. ISBN 978-1-873-40367-9. OCLC 491489502.
- Cherry, Bridget; Pevsner, Nikolaus (2002). London 4: North. The Buildings of England. New Haven, US and London: Yale University Press. ISBN 9780300096538.
- Clark, Anthony E. (2019). China Gothic: The Bishop of Beijing and His Cathedral. Washington, US: University of Washington Press. ISBN 978-0-295-74668-5.
- Clark, Kenneth (1983). The Gothic Revival: An Essay in the History of Taste. London: John Murray. ISBN 978-0-719-53102-6.
- Cooke, Robert (1987). The Palace of Westminster. London: Burton Skira. ISBN 978-2-882-49014-8.
- Cox, Oliver (8 November 2012). "An Oxford College and the Eighteenth-Century Gothic Revival" (PDF). Oxoniensia: 117–136.
- Crook, J. Mordaunt (2013). William Burges and the High Victorian Dream. London: Frances Lincoln. ISBN 978-0-7112-3349-2.
- Cruft, Kitty; Dunbar, John; Fawcett, Richard (2006). Borders. The Buildings of Scotland. New Haven, US and London: Yale University Press. ISBN 978-0-300-10702-9. OCLC 1062076262.
- Curl, James Stevens (1990). Victorian Architecture. Newton Abbot, Devon and London: David & Charles. ISBN 978-0-715-39144-0.
- Dixon, Roger; Muthesius, Stefan (1993). Victorian Architecture. London: Thames and Hudson. ISBN 978-0-195-20048-5.
- Eastlake, Charles Locke (2012). A History Of The Gothic Revival. Cambridge: Cambridge University Press. ISBN 978-1-108-05191-0.
- Ferriday, Peter (1963). Victorian Architecture. London: Jonathan Cape. OCLC 270335.
- Finnerty, Anne (2001). The Architecture of East Australia: An Architectural History in 432 Individual Presentations. Felbach, Germany: Edition Axel Menges. ISBN 978-3-930-69890-5.
- Fulton, Gordon W. (2005). "Ewart, David". Dictionary of Canadian Biography (online ed.). University of Toronto Press.
- Furneaux Jordan, Robert (1979). A Concise History of Western Architecture. London: Thames & Hudson. OCLC 757298161.
- Germann, Georg (1972). Gothic Revival in Europe and Britain: Sources, Influences and Ideas. London: Lund Humphries. ISBN 978-0-853-31343-4.
- Gifford, John (1989). William Adam 1689–1748: A Life and Times of Scotland's Universal Architect. Edinburgh: Mainstream Publishing. ISBN 978-1-851-58296-9. OCLC 600401309.
- Glendenning, Miles; MacInnes, Ranald; MacKechnie, Aonghus (2002). A History of Scottish Architecture: from the Renaissance to the Present Day. Edinburgh: Edinburgh University Press. ISBN 978-0-748-60741-9.
- Goodhart-Rendel, Harry Stuart (1989) [1953]. English Architecture Since The Regency: An Interpretation. London: Century. ISBN 978-0-712-61869-4. OCLC 243386485.
- Graur, Neaga (1970). Stiluri în arta decorativă (in Romanian). Bucharest: Cerces. OCLC 560131438.
- Harries, Susie (2011). Nikolaus Pevsner The Life. London: Chatto & Windus. ISBN 978-0-701-16839-1. OCLC 747917346.
- Hill, Rosemary (2007). God's Architect: Pugin and the Building of Romantic Britain. London: Allen Lane. ISBN 978-0-713-99499-5.
- Hitchcock, Henry-Russell (1968) [1958]. Architecture: Nineteenth and Twentieth Centuries. Pelican History of Art. London: Penguin Books. OCLC 851173836.
- Hobart, John Henry (1816). The Moral Efficacy and the Positive Benefits of the Ordinances of the Gospel: A Sermon Preached at the Consecration of Trinity Church, in the City of New Haven, on Wednesday, the 21st Day of February, A.D. 1816. Oliver Steele.
- Hull, Lise (2006). Britain's Medieval Castles. London: Praeger. ISBN 978-0-275-98414-4.
- Jackson, Alvin (2011). The Two Unions: Ireland, Scotland, and the Survival of the United Kingdom, 1707–2007. Oxford: Oxford University Press. ISBN 978-0-199-59399-6.
- Jarvis, Samuel Farmar (1814). An Address, Delivered in the City of New-Haven: At the Laying of the Corner-stone of Trinity Church, May 17th, 1814. Oliver Steele.
- Lindfield, Peter (2016). Georgian Gothic: Medievalist Architecture, Furniture and Interiors, 1730–1840. London: Boydell & Brewer. ISBN 978-1-783-27127-6.
- London, Christopher W. (2002). Bombay Gothic. Mumbai, India: India Book House. ISBN 81-7508-329-8. OCLC 53831002.
- Lowenthal, David (2015). The Past is a Foreign Country – Revisited. Cambridge, UK: Cambridge University Press. ISBN 978-0-521-85142-8.
- Macaulay, James (1975). The Gothic Revival 1745–1845. Glasgow and London: Blackie. ISBN 978-0-216-89892-9.
- Martin, Desmond (2012). "Bishop Robert Gray and Mrs Sophia Gray: Building Anglican Churches in South Africa, 1848–72". In G. A. Bremner (ed.). Ecclesiology Abroad: The British Empire and Beyond. Studies in Victorian Architecture and Design. Vol. 4. London: The Victorian Society. ISBN 978-0-901-65753-4. OCLC 825141174.
- Menin, Nicolas (1775). A description of the Coronation of the Kings and Queens of France. London: unknown. OCLC 1064350166.
- Metcalf, Thomas R. (1989). An Imperial Vision: Indian Architecture and Britain's Raj. London: Faber & Faber. ISBN 978-0-571-15419-7. OCLC 835581414.
- Midant, Jean-Paul (2002). Viollet-le-Duc: The French Gothic Revival. Paris: L'Aventurine. ISBN 978-2-914-19922-3.
- Morris, Jan (1986). Stones of Empire: The Buildings of the Raj. Oxford, UK: Oxford University Press. ISBN 978-0-192-82036-5. OCLC 473765817.
- McWilliam, Colin (1978). Lothian. The Buildings of Scotland. Harmondsworth, Middlesex: Penguin Books. ISBN 978-0-140-71066-3. OCLC 185487752.
- Pevsner, Nikolaus (1951). High Victorian Design: A Study of the Exhibits of 1851. London: Architectural Press. OCLC 875412662.
- Pevsner, Nikolaus (1969). Ruskin and Viollet-Le-Duc: Englishness and Frenchness in the Appreciation of Gothic Architecture. London: Thames and Hudson. OCLC 264998275.
- Poppeliers, John; Chambers, S. Allen; Schwartz, Nancy (1979). What Style Is It. Washington: The Preservation Press. ISBN 978-0-891-33065-3.
- Port, M. H. (2006). 600 New Churches: The Church Building Commission 1818–1856. Reading, UK: Spire Books. ISBN 978-1-904-96508-4.
- Rickman, Thomas (1848). An Attempt to Discriminate the Styles of Architecture in England: From the Conquest to the Reformation. London: J. H. Parker. p. 47. doi:10.1017/CBO9781107338241. ISBN 978-1-107-33824-1.
- Robson Scott, William Douglas (1965). The Literary Background of the Gothic Revival in Germany – A chapter in the history of taste. Oxford: Clarendon Press. OCLC 504490694.
- Ruskin, John (1989) [1849]. The Seven Lamps Of Architecture. New York: Dover Publications. ISBN 978-0-486-26145-4. OCLC 19886931.
- Sherwood, Jennifer; Pevsner, Nikolaus (1996). Oxfordshire. The Buildings of England. New Haven, US and London: Yale University Press. ISBN 978-0-30009-6392.
- Stamp, Gavin (1995). C. Brooks (ed.). The Victorian kirk: Presbyterian architecture in nineteenth century Scotland. The Victorian Church: Architecture and Society. Manchester: Manchester University Press. ISBN 0-7190-4020-5.
- — (1997). Caledonia Gothica: Pugin and the Gothic Revival in Scotland. Architectural Heritage. Edinburgh: Journal of the Architectural Heritage Society of Scotland. OCLC 632385481.
- — (2011). Saving a Century: the Victorian Society, 1958–2008. London: Victorian Society. ISBN 978-0-901-65740-4. OCLC 1141858753.
- — (2015). Gothic For The Steam Age: An Illustrated Biography of George Gilbert Scott. London: Aurum Press. ISBN 978-1-781-31124-0. OCLC 1123924291.
- Stanton, Phoebe B. (1997). The Gothic Revival and American Church Architecture: An Episode in Taste, 1840–1856. Baltimore, US and London: Johns Hopkins University Press. ISBN 978-0-801-85622-8. OCLC 38338245.
- Steegman, John (1970). Victorian Taste – A study of the Arts and Architecture from 1830 to 1870. Cambridge: Nelson's University Paperbacks. ISBN 978-0-262-69028-7.
- Sundt, Richard A. (2017). Timothy Brittain-Catlin; Jan De Maeyer; Martin Bressani (eds.). Gothic Revival Worldwide: A.W.N. Pugin's Global Influence. Leuven, Belgium: Leuven University Press. ISBN 978-9-462-70091-8.
- Toker, Franklin (1991). The Church of Notre Dame in Montreal: An Architectural History. Montreal: McGill–Queen's University Press. ISBN 978-0-773-50848-4.
- Turnor, Reginald (1950). Nineteenth Century Architecture in Britain. London: Batsford. OCLC 520344.
- Tuleshkov, Nikolaĭ (2007). Славинските първомайстори (Master Builders from Slavine) (in Bulgarian). София: Арх & Арт. ISBN 978-9-548-93140-3. OCLC 264741060.
- Verey, David; Brooks, Alan (2002) [1970]. Gloucestershire 2: The Vale and the Forest of Dean. The Buildings of England. New Haven, US and London: Yale University Press. ISBN 9780300097337.
- Whyte, Ian; Whyte, Kathleen A (1991). The Changing Scottish Landscape, 1500–1800. London: Routledge. ISBN 9780415029926.
