= Museum Building (Trinity College Dublin) =

- The Museum Building of Trinity College Dublin
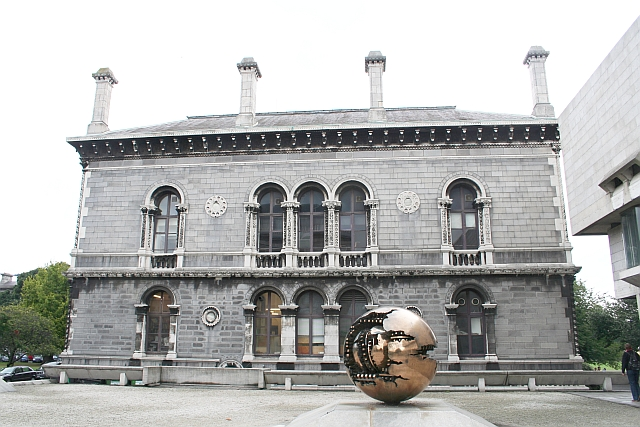
- View from outside the Berkeley Library.

General information
- Type: Seminar rooms and Libraries.
- Location: New Square; Trinity College; Dublin 2 Ireland
- Coordinates: 53.343836°N 6.255255°W
- Construction started: 1853
- Completed: 1857

Design and construction
- Architects: Thomas Newenham Deane, Benjamin Woodward

The Museum Building is a building within Trinity College. Finished in 1857 and located on the south of New Square, it is home to the university's Geology, Geography, Mechanical Engineering and Civil Engineering departments. It is a Palazzo style building, inspired by Byzantine architecture of Venice, and finished in Lombardo−Romanesque detailing, with over 108 highly decorated carved capitals.

== Construction ==
In 1833 the then Board of the College instigated a competition for a new Museum Building to contain the geological and various other collections which were housed within the large room of Regents House. Tenders were invited for almost twenty years, ending with the design submitted by the then-Cork firm of 'Deane, Woodward and Deane' (Thomas Deane Snr, Benjamin Woodward and Thomas Deane Jnr) being accepted in April 1853. At the time however a row with John McCurdy had caused some concerns to the Board.

On 23 May 1853 a contract for foundations was agreed with Messrs Cockburn & Son builders (for £24,000) and ground was broken some months later. It was during this time that Samuel Haughton (Professor of Geology) undertook an investigation into the suitability of the site due to its close proximity to the Old Library. He reported various layers of made ground, ash pits and calcareous drift, finally deeming the site permissible to build upon.

The exterior of the building was fully in place by 1855; however, it was not until 1857 that the interior was completed and the building as a whole finished.

=== Materials used in construction ===
Suitably fitting for a building designed to house a Geology collection, the Museum Building was constructed from a vast number of different and contrasting forms of stone. College tradition holds that it some form of stone from every quarry in Ireland during the time of its construction was used somewhere within the building.

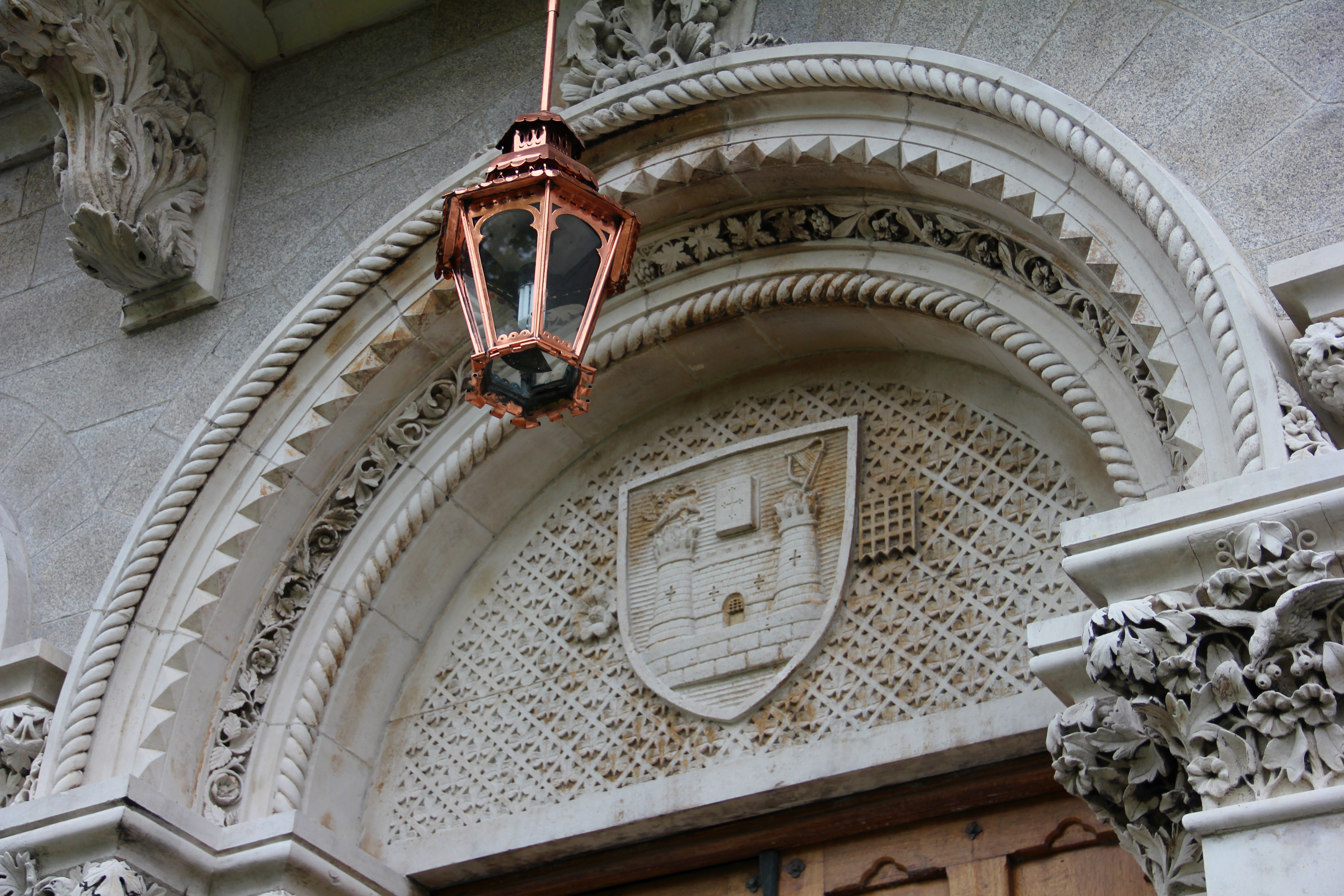
The Tympanum, of Caen stone. Depicts a 19th-century variant coat of arms of the College. This can also be seen on the Campanile

==== Exterior ====
The exterior walls were first constructed from Calp Limestone, which were then faced with 22.86 cm (9 inches) of Ballyknockan Granite. The quoins, columns and 108 capitals, as well as the string course which can be seen halfway up the building, are all of Portland stone from the Isle of Portland, Dorset. The tympanum over the heavy wooden main door to building and which bears the crest of the college (a popular 19th-century variant, slightly different from the one currently used by the college today) is of Caen stone from Caen, France. Overall the exterior amounted to just under half the cost for the entire building.

==== Interior ====
Initially Deane and Woodward had planned for the interior walls to be of rubble which would then be plastered over. However, in early 1855 they submitted a design change to the Board, deciding instead to use Caen Stone, and the Board agreed. However, when they had learnt that only two thirds of the stone had arrived the Board rescinded this permission. After strong argument from Deane, on 4 May they Board overruled their prior decision and agreed to the use of Caen Stone.

The large domed central hall once again makes heavy use of Irish stone. The Romanesque arches between each column use alternating yellow and red stained blocks which sit upon bases and capitals of heavily carved Portland stone. The central staircase and floors of the upper balconies are also made of Portland stone. The original floor was composed of Yorkstone flagstones, further Portland stone, Welsh Ffestiniog stone, with black squares of black slate, however this floor later relaid.

The main entrance hall of the building houses fourteen full columns and eighteen half-column made of Irish marble, although the only true marble is Connemara serpentine. There had been some problems sourcing the materials needed to have every column complete, which after more petitioning from Deane resulted in the half columns. The only non-Irish stone used in the columns is a dark red serpentine from Ruan Minor, The Lizard peninsula area of Cornwall.

The known stone from which the columns are made of include:

- Lizard serpentine from Cornwall, England
- Connemara marble from Barna and Clifden in County Galway
- Cork red marble from Baneshane, Little Island and Midleton in County Cork
- Armagh Marble from County Armagh in Northern Ireland
- Clonony marble from Clonony in County Offaly
- Galway marble from Menlo, County Galway
- Mitchelstown marble from Mitchelstown in County Cork
- Kilkenny marble from County Kilkenny
- Castle Caldwell marble from Castle Caldwell, near Belleek, County Fermanagh in Northern Ireland

Some of the interior room designs by Deane and Woodward were never realised, as the official college architect John McCurdy had convinced the Board otherwise.

== Carvings ==
The entirety of the building's carvings are by brothers John and James O'Shea of O'Shea and Whelan who gathered wild flowers to use as models from the college's botanical garden near Ballsbridge. There are seven carvings that relate specifically to Aesop's Fables, and one (considered to be the most important) which refers to Charles Darwin and Evolution.

=== Restoration ===
College records from May 1860 mention of how the smoggy atmosphere had adversely affected the stone. After years of laying behind sooty deposits the ashlar of the building had become obscured. In 2010 a three-year conservation programme of the Museum Building was begun. Once finished in March 2013, many of the carvings which were almost invisible had been restored to their past state.

== In media ==
- The building appears in the 1995 film Circle of Friends as characters descend the main interior staircase

== See also ==
- Trinity College Dublin Zoological Museum (est. 1777)
