= Trinity College Dublin Zoological Museum =

Museum in Dublin, Ireland

Coordinates: 53.3432°N 6.2517°W

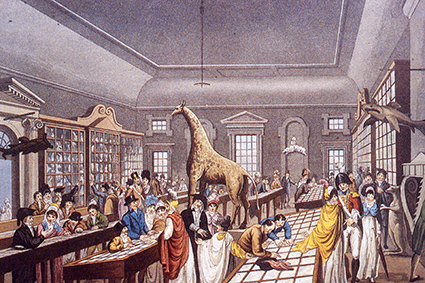
The Regent House Museum

The zoology museum of Trinity College Dublin was formed in 1777 at Regent House, Strand Street in Dublin, Ireland. Robert Ball on appointment as director (1844–1857), donated his personal collection, and was largely responsible for amassing most of the material by gift, purchase, through personal contacts and especially through the Dublin University Zoological Association. Thomas Coulter further strengthened the collections which came to include insect cabinets by James Tardy and John Curtis.

== History ==
In 1833, the Board of the College (of Trinity College) initiated a competition for plans for a new building to be constructed intended "to contain the geological and other collections", which at that point were in "a large room in Regent House". Over the following two decades, numerous architects submitted drawings for the project, whilst others, such as Decimus Burton notably declined their invitation to do so. The designs of the firm of 'Deane, Woodward and Deane' (Thomas Deane Snr, Benjamin Woodward and Thomas Deane Jnr) were eventually accepted in April 1853, having first survived claims of plagiarism by architect John McCurdy. The new building, which became known as the Museum Building, was built between 1853 and 1857.

An 1876 building was specifically designed to house the collection. Today it is housed in a small area on the first floor. Significant specimens include an Irish Great Auk, an early marsupial collection including a thylacine, a kākāpō, a, "Great Indian Rhinoceros" (partial) and birds collected by Charles Darwin. A collection of Blaschka glass models of marine life date from c.1870.

== Mentions ==
December 16, 1854. Robert Ball, LL.D., President, in the Chair. "The President gave a demonstration on the Coracidae, being in continuation of a series illustrative of the collection in the University Museum, and exhibited various species"

"February 3, 1855. R. Ball, LL.D., President, in the Chair The President gave a demonstration of the families Meropidae and Upupidae, being in continuation of a series illustrative of the collection in the University Museum".

The Museum of the Dublin University contains three skeletons of the Giant Irish Deer; two adult males and a female. These skeletons are very nearly perfect, being furnished with all the small bones and the incisor teeth; only a few pieces of the tail being deficient. The female is very elegant, the lightness of the cervical vertebras and the slender limbs presenting a marked contrast to the males. This is supposed to be the only skeleton of the female that has been preserved in any tolerable condition. Besides the skeletons, the Museum possesses six sets of horns, in a series from an early age up to the maximum growth; a very fine small head, with short horns, and a beautifully perfect set of teeth.

== Gallery ==
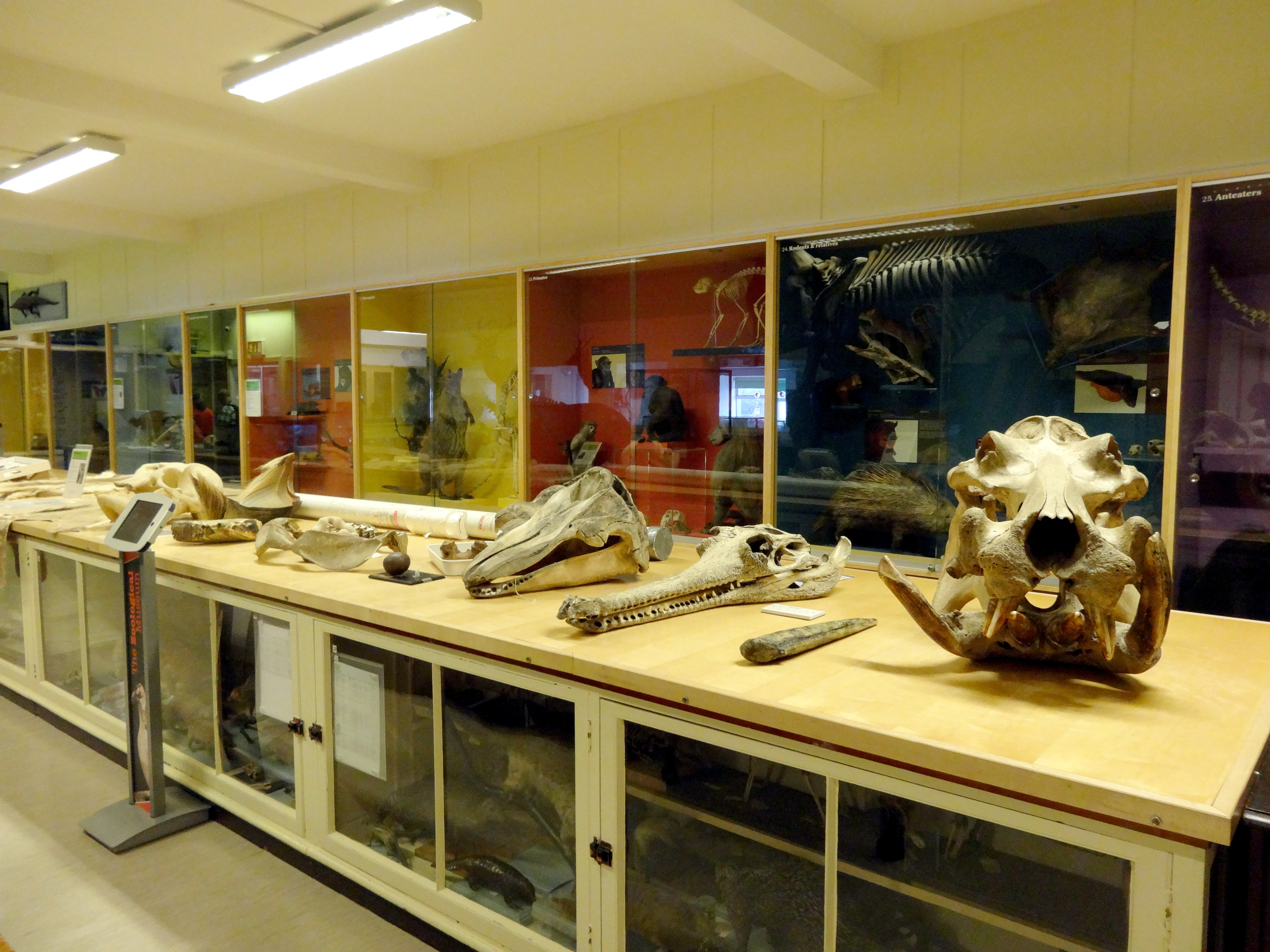

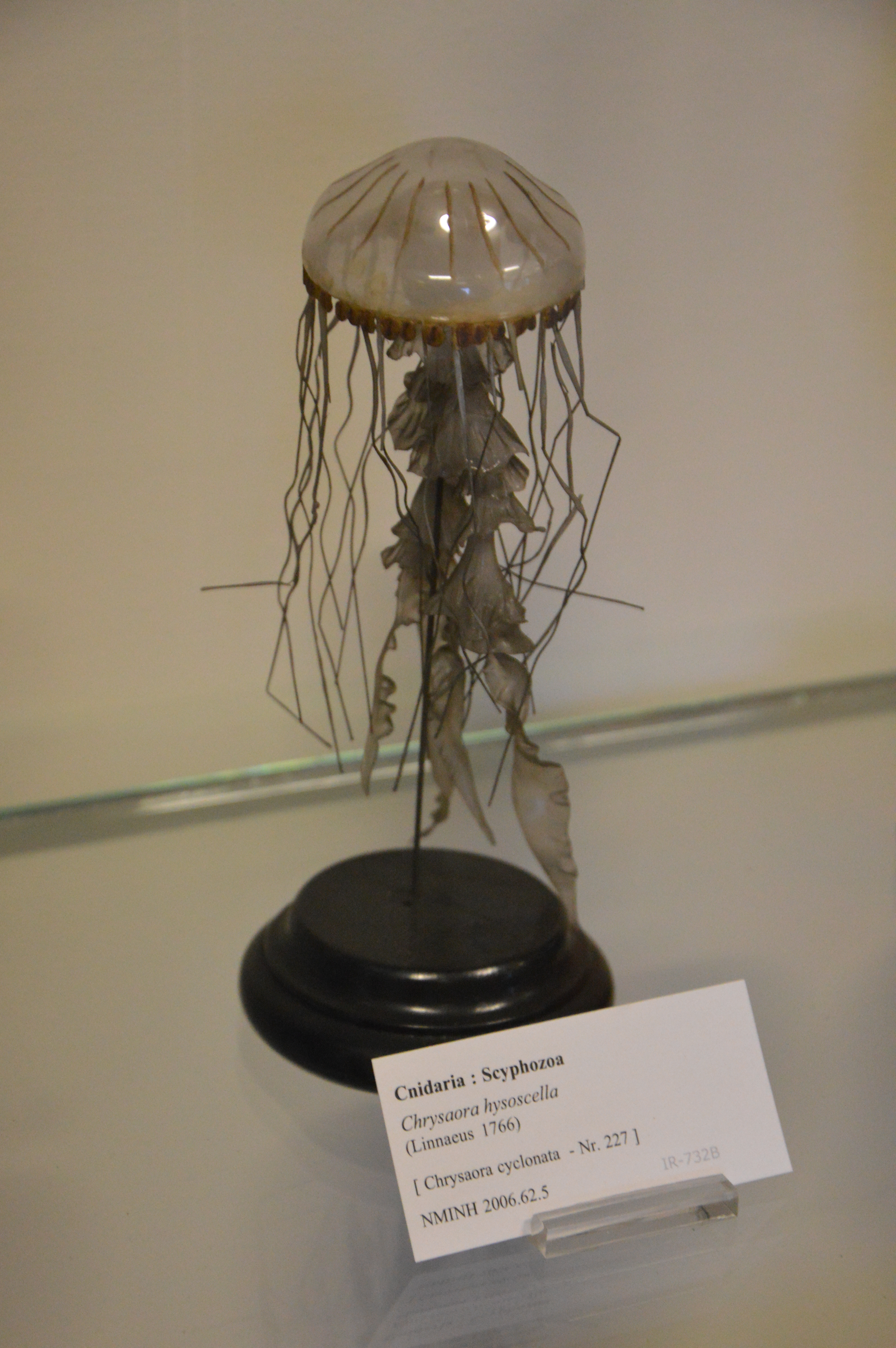

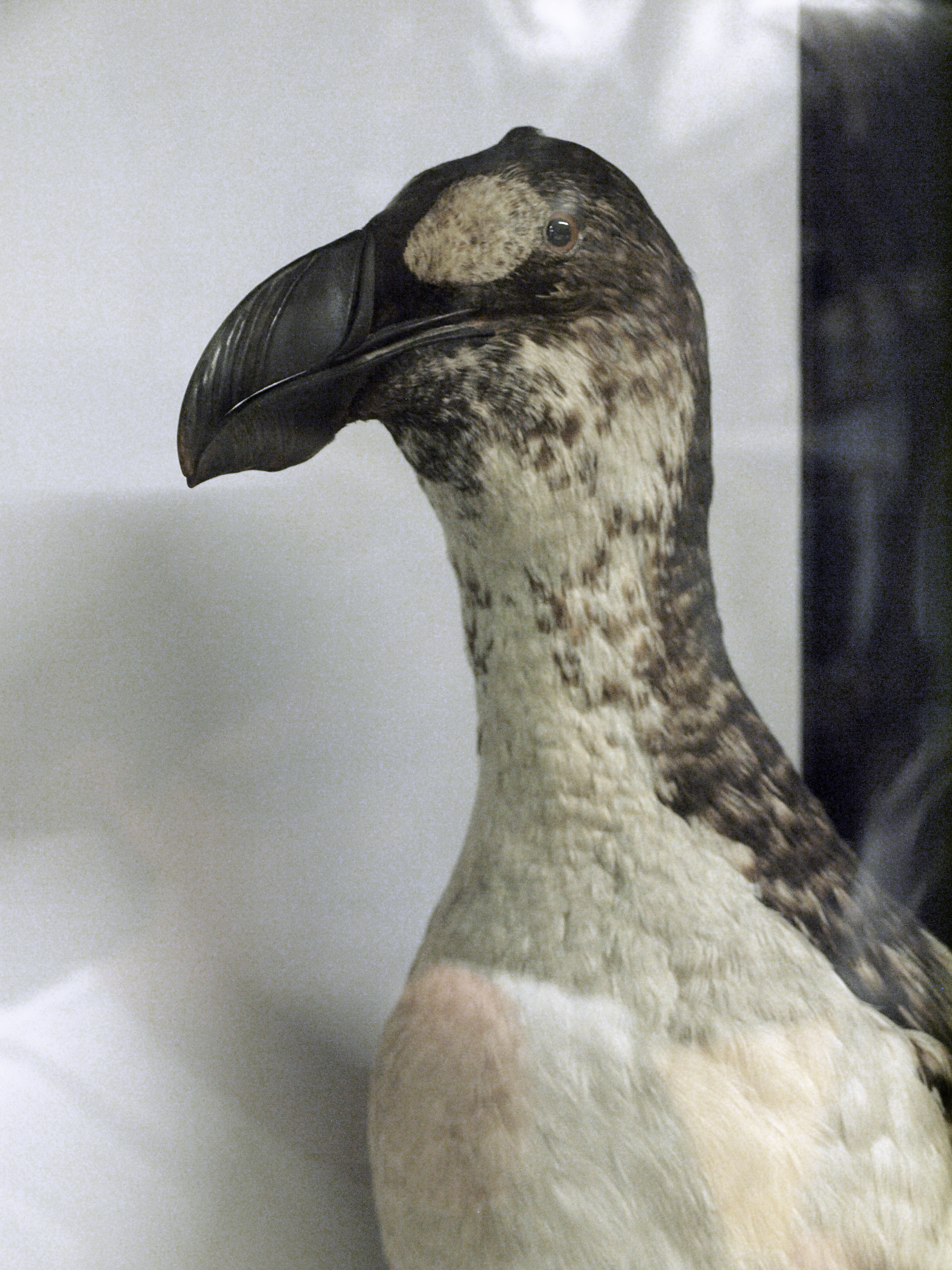

== See also ==
- Leskean Cabinet
- National Museum of Ireland – Natural History
