= Oxford University Museum of Natural History =

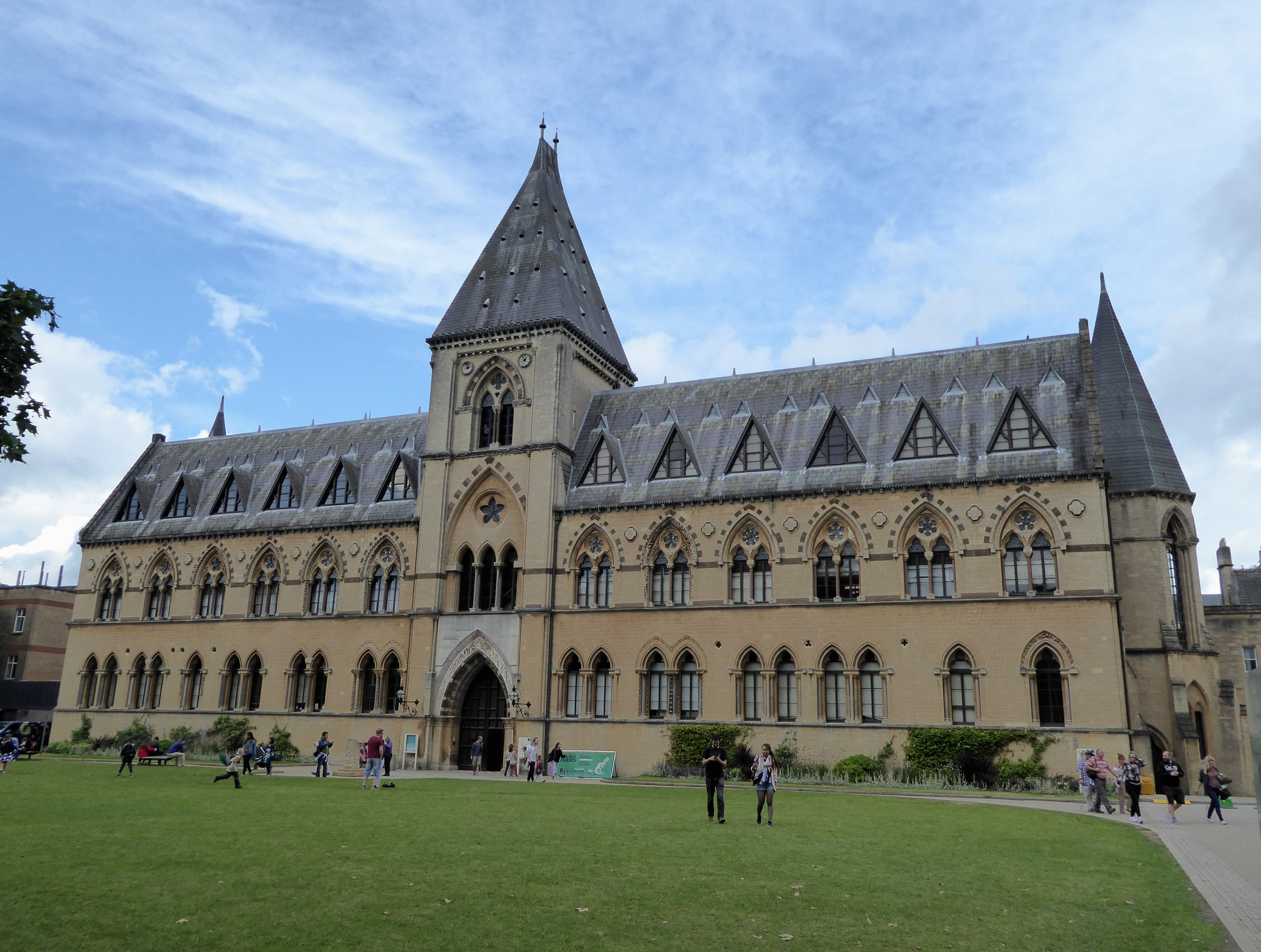
- Front view of the museum

- Oxford University Museum of Natural History
- Established: 1860; 166 years ago
- Location: Parks Road, Oxford, England
- Coordinates: 51.7586°N 1.2557°W
- Type: University museum of natural history
- Collections: Natural history
- Collection size: approx. 7 million objects
- Visitors: 792,282 (2019)
- Founder: Sir Henry Acland
- Director: Gavin J. Svenson
- Architects: Thomas Newenham Deane, Benjamin Woodward
- Website: oumnh.ox.ac.uk

The Oxford University Museum of Natural History (OUMNH) is a museum displaying many of the University of Oxford's natural history specimens, located on Parks Road in Oxford, England. It also contains a lecture theatre which is used by the university's chemistry, zoology and mathematics departments. The museum provides the only public access into the adjoining Pitt Rivers Museum.

== History ==
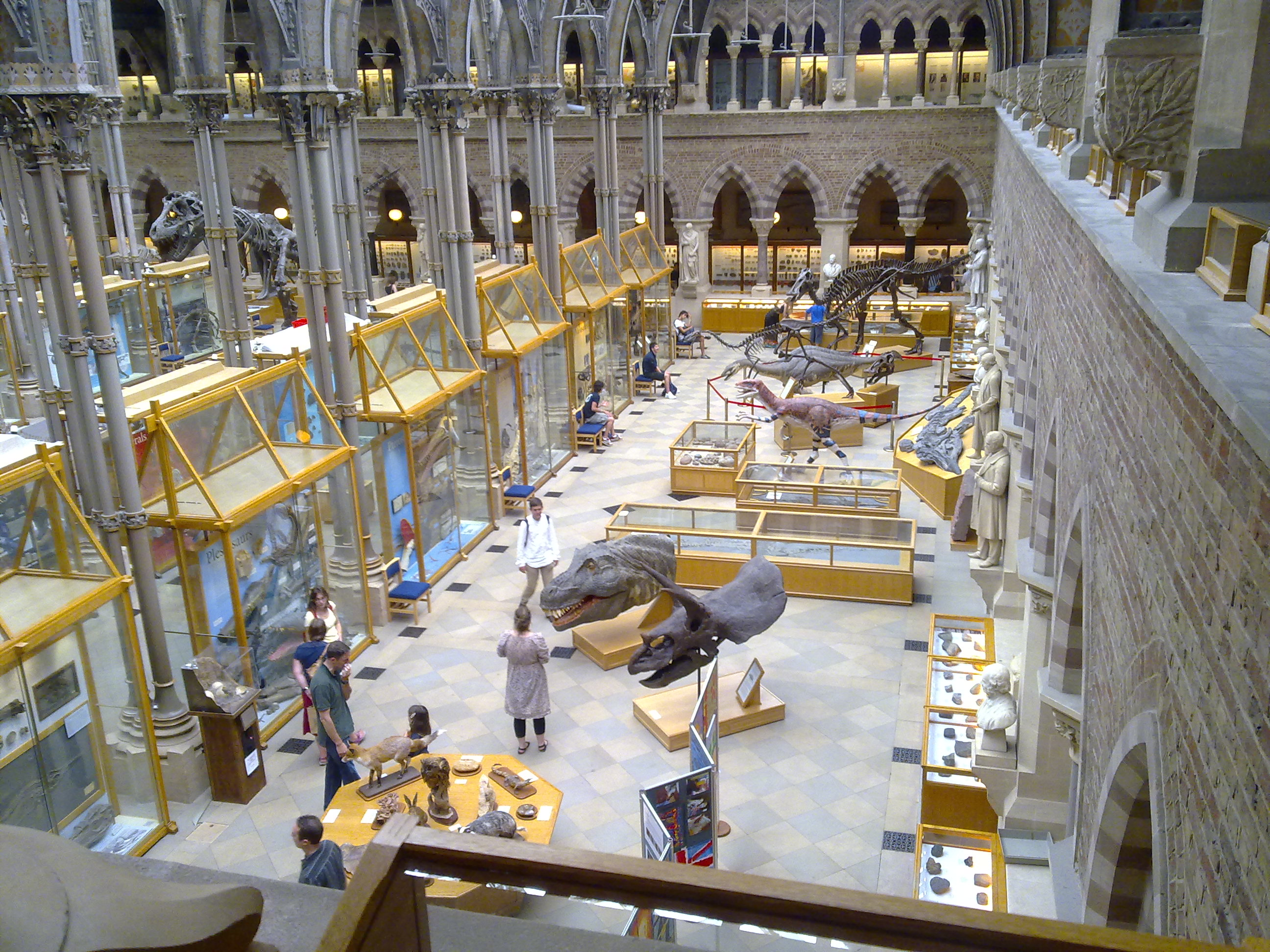
The Dinosaur Gallery of the museum before renovation in 2023–24

The university's Honour School of Natural Science started in 1850, but the facilities for teaching were scattered around the city of Oxford in the various colleges. The university's collection of anatomical and natural history specimens were similarly spread around the city. Regius Professor of Medicine, Sir Henry Acland, initiated the construction of the museum between 1855 and 1860, to bring together all the aspects of science around a central display area. The building was officially opened in 1860, although various departments had occupied their premises from as early as 1858. In 1858, Acland gave a lecture on the museum, setting forth the reason for the building's construction. He viewed that the university had been one-sided in the forms of study it offered—chiefly theology, philosophy, the classics and history—and that the opportunity should be offered to learn of the natural world and obtain the "knowledge of the great material design of which the Supreme Master-Worker has made us a constituent part". This idea, of Nature as the Second Book of God, was common in the 19th century.

The largest portion of the museum's collections consist of the natural history specimens from the Ashmolean Museum, including the specimens collected by John Tradescant the elder and his son of the same name, William Burchell and geologist William Buckland. The Christ Church Museum donated its osteological and physiological specimens, many of which were collected by Acland. The construction of the building was accomplished through money earned from the sale of Bibles. Several departments moved within the building—astronomy, geometry, experimental physics, mineralogy, chemistry, geology, zoology, anatomy, physiology and medicine. As the departments grew in size over the years, they moved to new locations along South Parks Road, which remains the home of the university's Science Area.

The last department to leave the building was the entomology department, which moved into the zoology building in 1978. However, there is still a working entomology laboratory on the first floor of the museum building. Between 1885 and 1886 a new building to the east of the museum was constructed to house the ethnological collections of General Augustus Pitt Rivers—the Pitt Rivers Museum. In 19th-century thinking, it was very important to separate objects made by the hand of God (natural history) from objects made by the hand of man (anthropology).

The museum began undergoing an ambitious re-display project, 'Life, As We Know It', in 2018 which will be completed in July 2026. This is the first major overhaul of permanent displays at the Museum in over 20 years. The first of four phases of the project, 'Out of the Deep', installed two display cases to house the Plesiosaur fossils, as a start towards a new 'Past ecosystems of Oxfordshire' display. Phase 2, in 2020, installed 10 new double-sided glass cabinets with pitched glass 'roofs', to show 20 new displays illustrating 'Biodiversity, Evolution and Earth'. A further 16 displays were added in 2024 as phase three, looking at 'Biodiversity; How evolution works' and 'Present-day ecosystems'. Phase four will complete the re-display with 6 more glass cases, featuring 11 new displays 'telling the story of the intricate relationships between planet and life'.

== The building ==
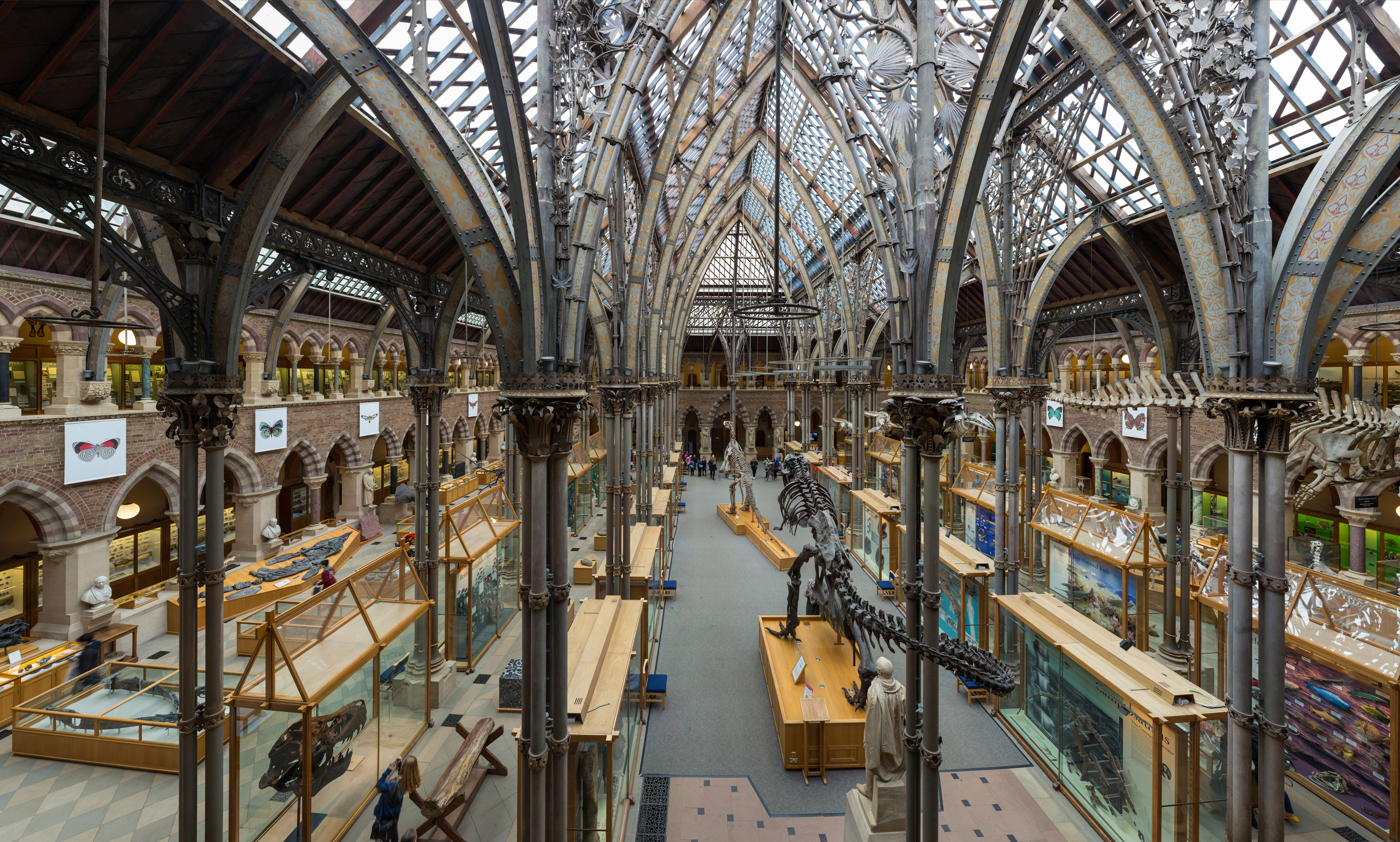
The interior from the gallery level.

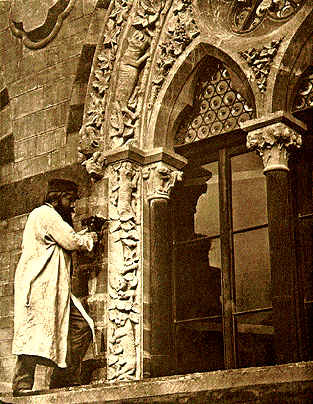
James O'Shea at work on carvings of animals and plants.

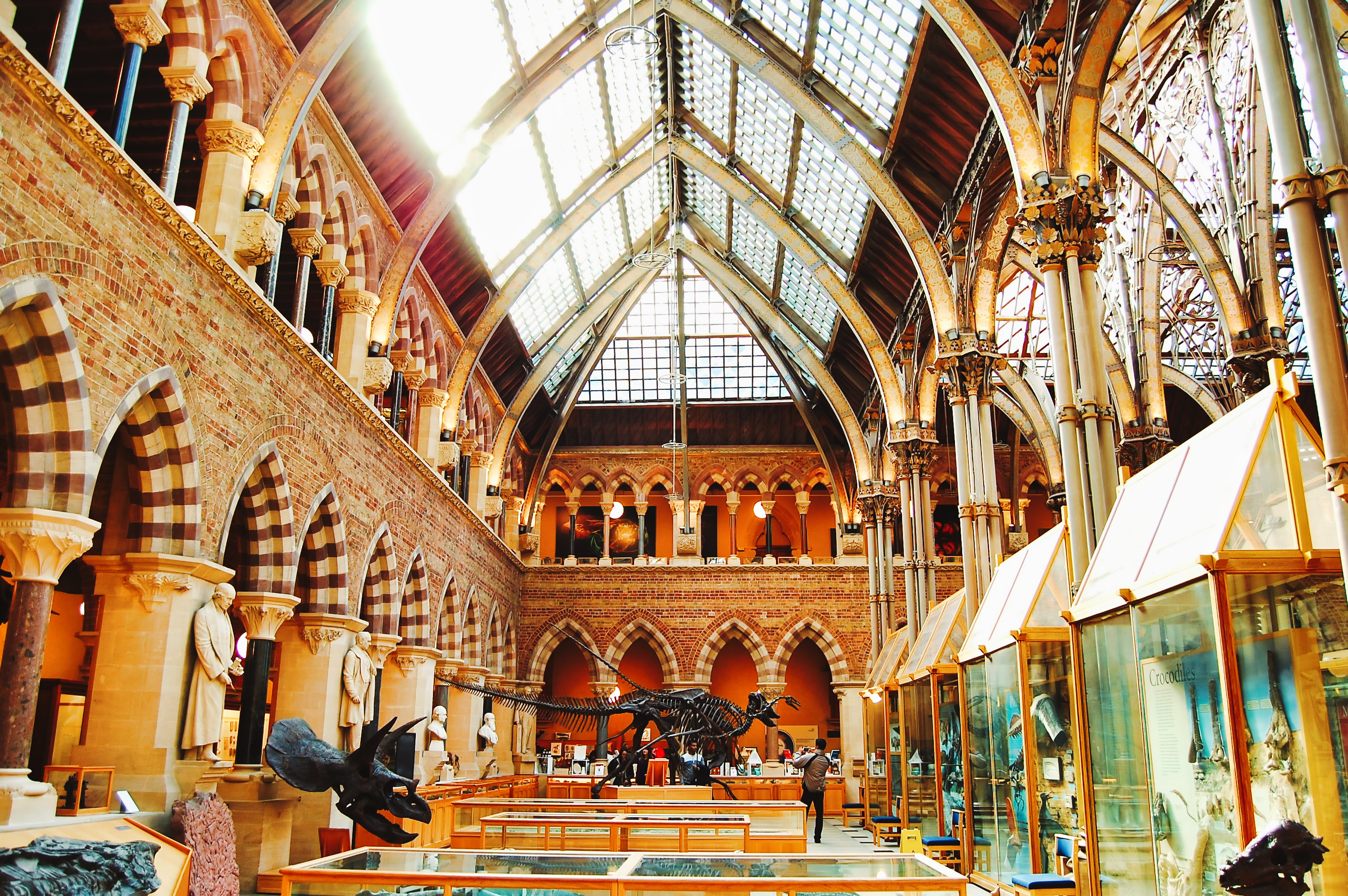
Roof and dinosaur exhibition hall

The neo-Gothic building was designed by the Irish architects Thomas Newenham Deane and Benjamin Woodward, mostly Woodward. The museum's design was directly influenced by the writings of critic John Ruskin, who involved himself by making various suggestions to Woodward during construction. Construction by Lucas Brothers began in 1855, and the building was ready for occupancy in 1860.

The adjoining building that houses the Pitt Rivers Museum was the work of Thomas Manly Deane, son of Thomas Newenham Deane. It was built between 1885 and 1886.

The museum consists of a large square court with a glass roof, supported by cast iron pillars, which divide the court into three aisles. Cloistered arcades run around the ground and first floor of the building, with stone columns each made from a different British stone, selected by geologist John Phillips (the Keeper of the Museum). The ornamentation of the stonework and iron pillars incorporates natural forms such as leaves and branches, combining the Pre-Raphaelite style with the scientific role of the building.

Statues of eminent men of science stand around the ground floor of the court—from Aristotle and Bacon through to Darwin and Linnaeus. Although the university paid for the construction of the building, the ornamentation was funded by public subscription, and much of it remains incomplete. The Irish stone carvers O'Shea and Whelan had been employed to create lively freehand carvings in the Gothic manner. When funding dried up, they offered to work unpaid, but they were accused by members of the University Convocation of "defacing" the building by adding unauthorised work. According to Henry Acland, the O'Shea brothers responded by caricaturing the members of Convocation as parrots and owls in the carving over the building's entrance. Acland, writing in 1893, insists that he forced them to remove the heads from these carvings.

On 12 January 1954 both the Natural History and adjoining Pitt Rivers museums were Grade I listed as being "one of the most significant and carefully detailed museum complexes of the mid-late C19, as well as being a seminal monument to Oxford's scientific awakening."

== Significant events ==
=== The 1860 evolution debate ===
A significant debate in the history of evolutionary biology took place in the museum in 1860 at a meeting of the British Association for the Advancement of Science. Representatives of the Church and science debated the subject of evolution, and the event is often viewed as symbolising the defeat of a literalist interpretation of the Genesis creation narrative. However, there are few eye-witness accounts of the debate, and most accounts of the debate were written by scientists.

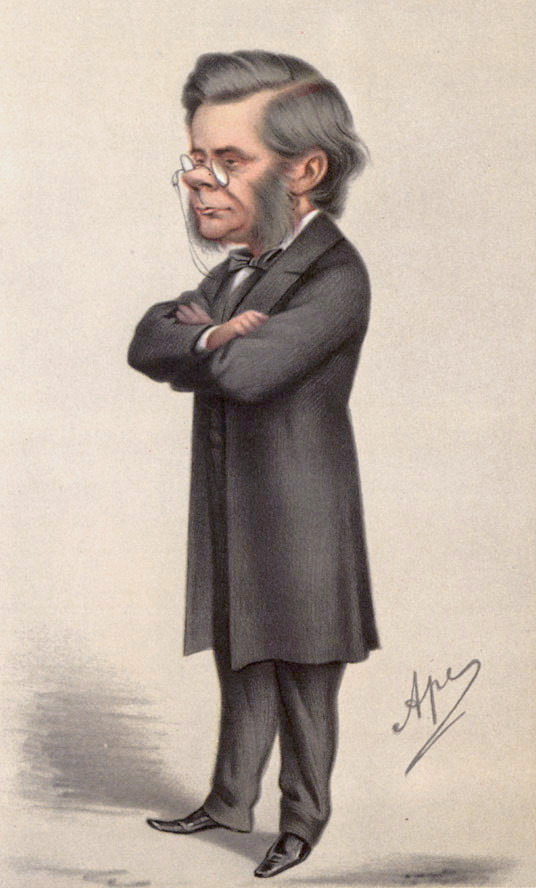
Caricature of Thomas Huxley from Vanity Fair

The biologist Thomas Huxley and Samuel Wilberforce, the Bishop of Oxford, are generally cast as the main protagonists in the debate. Huxley was a keen scientist and a staunch supporter of Darwin's theories. Wilberforce had supported the construction of the museum as the centre for the science departments, for the study of the wonders of God's creations.

On the Wednesday of the meeting, 27 June 1860, botanist Charles Daubeny presented a paper on plant sexuality, which made reference to Darwin's theory of natural selection. Richard Owen, a zoologist who believed that evolution was governed by divine influence, criticised the theory pointing out that the brain of the gorilla was more different from that of man than that of other primates. Huxley stated that he would respond to this comment in print, and declined to continue the debate. However, rumours began to spread that the Bishop of Oxford would be attending the conference on the following Saturday.

Initially, Huxley was planning to avoid the bishop's speech. However, evolutionist Robert Chambers convinced him to stay.

Wilberforce's speech on 30 June 1860 was good-humoured and witty, but was an unfair attack on Darwinism, ending in the now infamous question to Huxley of whether "it was through his grandfather or grandmother that he claimed descent from a monkey." Some commentators suggested that this question was written by Owen, and others suggested that the bishop was taught by Owen. (Owen and Wilberforce had known each other since childhood.)

Huxley is purported to have turned to his neighbour, chemist Professor Brodie, and said in an undertone, "The Lord hath delivered him into mine hands." When Huxley spoke, he responded that he had heard nothing from Wilberforce to prejudice Darwin's arguments, which still provided the best explanation of the origin of species yet advanced. He ended with the equally famous response to Wilberforce's question, that he had "no need to be ashamed of having an ape for his grandfather, but that he would be ashamed of having for an ancestor a man of restless and versatile interest who distracts the attention of his hearers from the real point at issue by eloquent digression and skilled appeals to religious prejudice."

However it seems unlikely that the debate was as spectacular as traditionally suggested – contemporary accounts by journalists do not make mention of the words that have become such notable quotations. Additionally, contemporary accounts suggest that it was not Huxley, but Sir Joseph Hooker who most vocally defended Darwinism at the meeting.

While all the accounts of the event suggest that the supporters of Darwinism were the most persuasive, it seems likely that the exact nature of the debate was made more sensational in the reports of Huxley's supporters to encourage further support for Darwin's theories.

=== The 1894 demonstration of wireless telegraphy ===
One of the first public demonstrations of wireless telegraphy took place in the lecture theatre of the museum on 14 August 1894, carried out by Professor Oliver Lodge. A morse code radio signal was sent from the neighbouring Clarendon Laboratory building, and received by apparatus set up by Dr Alexander Muirhead in the lecture theatre. The demonstration, along with a lecture by Prof. Lodge given on 1 June 1894 at the Royal Institution in London, was a component of the claim against Guglielmo Marconi's patent of 1895. The claim found in favour of Lodge and Muirhead, who then sold the patent rights to Marconi, who was by then already laying the foundations of modern wireless communication systems.

=== Charles Dodgson and the dodo ===
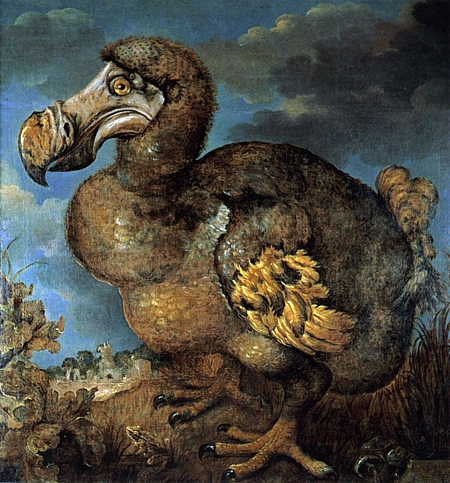
Jan Savery's 1851 painting of a dodo. It is now thought the birds were slimmer than traditionally portrayed.

The museum displays a 1651 painting of a dodo by Flemish artist, Jan Savery, along with remains of an actual dodo and several models. Charles Dodgson, better known by his pen-name Lewis Carroll, was a regular visitor to the museum, and Savery's painting is likely to have influenced the character of the Dodo in Carroll's Alice's Adventures in Wonderland.

The museum holds the only soft-tissue specimen of a dodo anywhere in the world. Only a head and a leg remains of the specimen which came from the Ashmolean's founding collection from John Tradescant.

== Collections ==
The museum collections are divided into three sections: Earth Collections covering the Palaeontological collections and the mineral and rock collections, Life Collections which include zoological and entomological collections, and the Archive Collections.

The Hope Entomological Collections, numbering over five million specimens are held by the museum. The Hope Department was founded by Frederick William Hope and the first appointed curator of the collections was John Obadiah Westwood. Many important insect and arachnid specimens from various collectors and collections make up the museums holdings including (but not limited to) those of Octavius Pickard-Cambridge, George Henry Verrall, Pierre François Marie Auguste Dejean, Pierre André Latreille, Alfred Russel Wallace, Charles Darwin, Jacques Marie François Bigot, and Pierre Justin Marie Macquart among others.

== The museum today ==
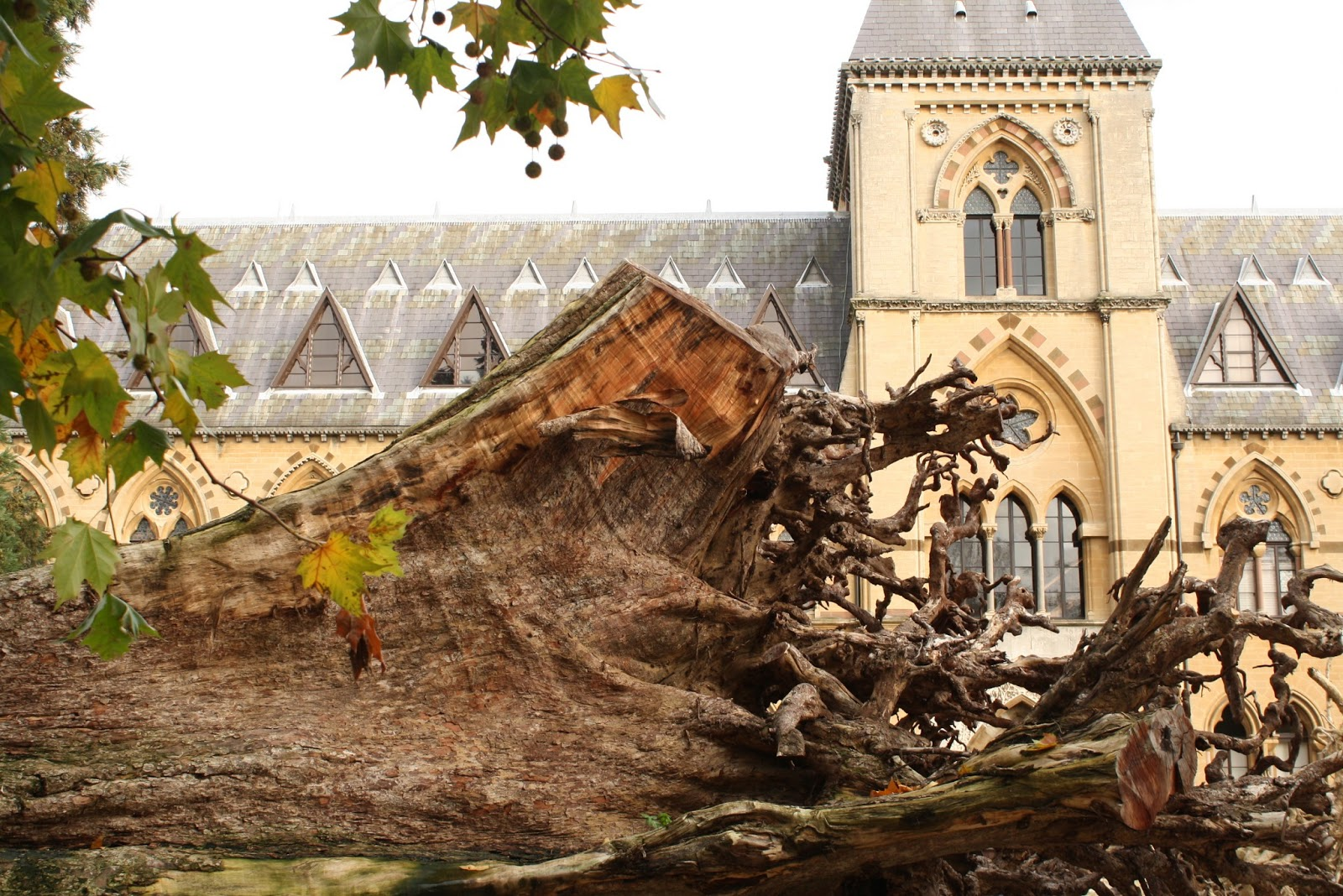
The museum foregrounded by the 'Ghost Forest' installation, March 2011

The museum is led by a director (as of 2025, Dr Gavin J. Svenson, formerly the Curator of Invertebrate Zoology and Chief Science Officer at the Cleveland Museum of Natural History), and there are visitor experience, education, outreach, IT, library, conservation, and technical staff.

Since 1997 the museum has benefited from external funding, from government and private sources, and undertaken a renewal of its displays which began in 2018, continuing on today (2025). As well as central exhibits featuring the historic skeleton parade and dinosaurs, there are sets of displays which replaced the historic Victorian cabinets, on a variety of themes: Evolution, Earth, Biodiversity, Ecosystems. There are also a number of popular touchable items, which include two bears, a fox, and other taxidermy. Additionally, there is a meteorite and large fossils and minerals.

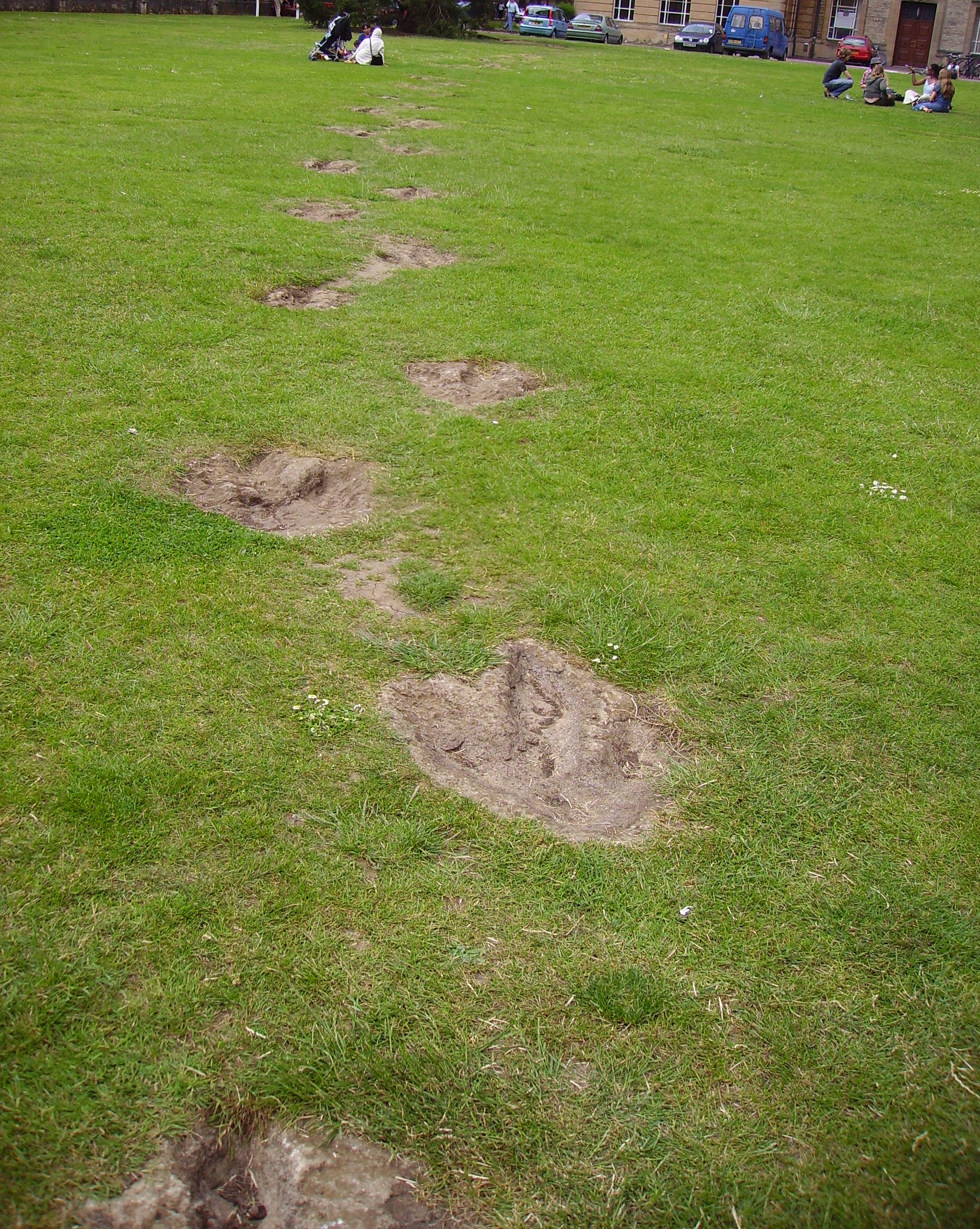
Megalosaur trail reconstruction

A famous group of ichnites (fossilised footprints) was found in a limestone quarry at Ardley, 20 km northeast of Oxford, in 1997, 2024 and 2025. They were thought to have been made by Megalosaurus and possibly Cetiosaurus. There are replicas of some of these footprints set across the front lawn of the museum.

The tower of the museum is a popular nesting area for migrating swifts. The colony of swifts here has been the subject of a research study since May 1947, when Elizabeth Lack and David Lack installed nest boxes in the tower. It is one of the longest continuous studies of a single bird species in the world, and has contributed much to our knowledge of the swift. Cameras have been installed which broadcast a live stream to a display near the main entrance during the summer months when the swifts are nesting.

On March 17, 2020, the museum shut indefinitely due to the COVID-19 pandemic. It reopened with some restrictions on September 22, 2020.

The Sequoiadendron giganteum tree in front of the museum was 35.7m tall in 2006. As "the tallest object in central Oxford", in 2024 the tree was fitted with a lightning rod to help protect it in the event of a lightning strike.

On the 6 May 2024 a Palestinian solidarity encampment was erected on the front lawn of the museum. This began the 2024 University of Oxford pro-Palestinian campus occupations.

== Keepers, secretaries and directors ==
Keepers of the University Museum
Name	from	To
John Phillips	1857	1874
Henry Smith	1874	1883
Edward Burnett Tylor	1883	1902

Secretaries to the Delegates of the University Museum
Name	from	To
Sir Henry Alexander Miers	1902	1908
Gilbert Charles Bourne (acting secretary)	1908	1909
Henry Balfour	1909	1911
Herbert Lister Bowman	1911	1925
Thomas Vipond Barker	1925	1928
Sydney G. P. Plant	1928	1955
Geoffrey E. S. Turner	1956	1964

Directors of the University Museum of Natural History
Name	from	To
Keith Thomson	1998	2003
Jim Kennedy	2003	2011
Paul Smith	2011	2024
Gavin J. Svenson	2025	

== In drama and popular culture ==
The museum has been featured in several movies, dramas, television shows and documentaries.

John Purser's radio play, Parrots and Owls, commissioned by BBC Scotland and Radio 3, dramatising the controversy over the satirical stone carvings around the Museum's entrance, was broadcast in 1994, with Seán McGinley in the role of James O'Shea, Brid Brennan as Nuala, Michael Pennington as John Ruskin, and Cara Kelly as Effie Gray.

Several scenes for the 2004 Animal Planet docufiction film The Last Dragon (known in the United States as Dragons: A Fantasy Made Real) were filmed at the Oxford museum.

Various scenes were filmed around Oxford for the 2017 blockbuster science fiction action sequel Transformers: The Last Knight, including one scene in which Viviane Wembly (Laura Haddock) is giving a tour to a group of students as Sir Edmund Burton (Anthony Hopkins) drops in, was shot in the university and museum.

Scenes were shot at the museum for the BBC One and HBO fantasy drama His Dark Materials.

A deleted scene for the Marvel Superhero film Eternals featuring Kit Harington and Lia McHugh was filmed at the museum.

Opening scenes from Prehistoric Planet with David Attenborough were filmed in the main court with the T. rex model.

== See also ==
- The Abbot's Kitchen, an early chemistry laboratory next to the museum, built at the same time
- Museum of Oxford, dedicated to the history of the city of Oxford
- Radcliffe Science Library, the science library of Oxford University, close to the museum
