= Blackrock, Cork =

Blackrock An Charraig Dhubh
- Suburb
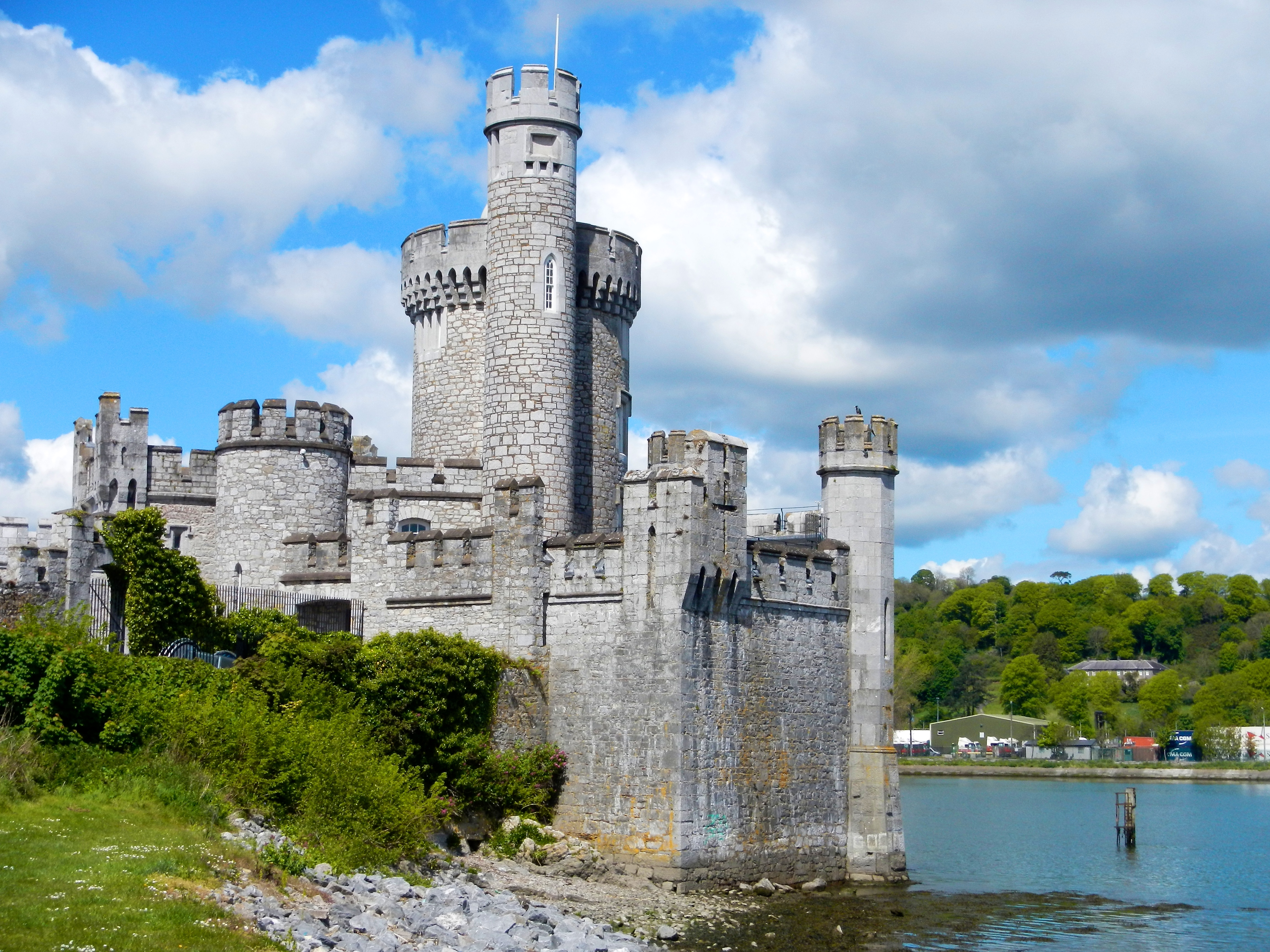
- Blackrock Castle

- Location in Ireland
- Coordinates: 51°53′51″N 8°24′46″W
- Country: Ireland
- Province: Munster
- Administrative area: Cork (city)
- Time zone: UTC+0 (WET)
  - Summer (DST): UTC-1 (IST (WEST))

Blackrock is a suburb, with a village core, in the southeast of Cork City, Ireland. Originally a small fishing village about five kilometres from Cork City, the growth of the city over time has meant that the village has become incorporated into the city. It is home to Blackrock GAA club, Blackrock Castle, a weekly farmers market, and as of 2015 has seen some investment in regeneration projects for the traditional village centre. Blackrock is within the Cork South-Central Dáil constituency.

== Places of interest ==
A short distance from the village is Blackrock Castle. There has been a castle on the site since medieval times but the present castle was built in the mid-19th century in mock-baronial style. It now houses an observatory and planetarium.

The Marina, a tree-lined avenue (not strictly a marina) runs along the southern bank of the River Lee from Blackrock Village past Páirc Uí Chaoimh and is a used for a number of recreational activities such as rowing, walking and cycling. The Atlantic Pond, in the shadow of Páirc Uí Chaoimh, is also used by walkers and is populated by wildlife, mainly ducks and swans.

Dundanion Castle, overlooking the Marina but difficult to access, is a ruined 16th-century castle. It is from this spot that William Penn reputedly sailed on his first voyage to America in 1682 before founding the state of Pennsylvania.

Blackrock Village hosts a farmer's market every Sunday morning in the village square. A pathway links the village to the relatively new development of Eden in Blackrock, which is a mix of apartments, duplexes and houses along with green spaces built on the former grounds of Blackrock convent. The village square and surrounding area were subject to a €2 million "rejuvenation" scheme between 2015 and 2017.

== Transport ==
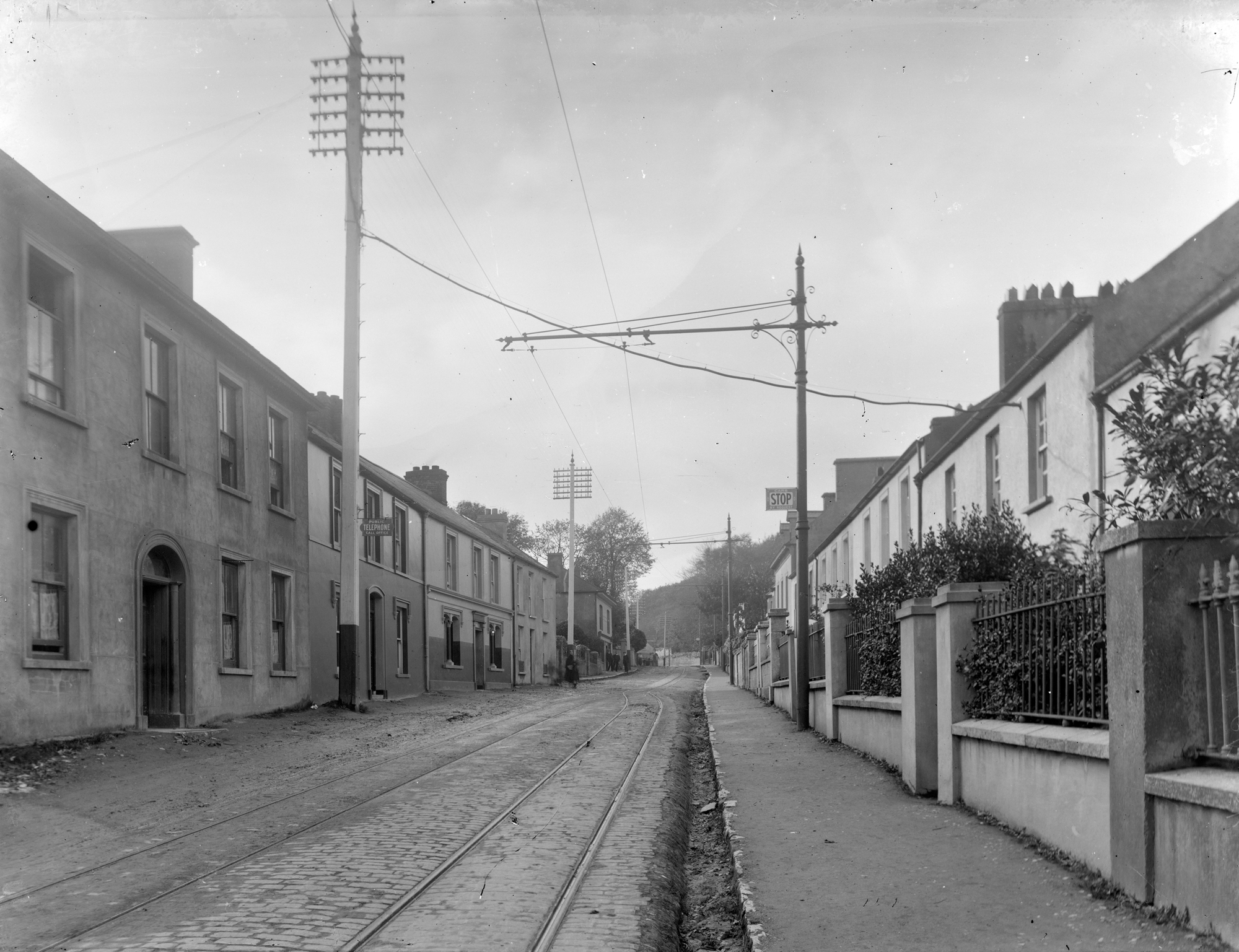
Blackrock Road in the early 20th century, with the tramway of the Cork Electric Tramways and Lighting Company

Blackrock was formerly served by the narrow gauge Cork, Blackrock and Passage Railway. Blackrock railway station opened on 8 June 1850, but finally closed on 12 September 1932. the old railway line is now used by walkers and cyclists as an amenity. From 1898 to 1931 it was served by the Cork Electric Tramways and Lighting Company.

The number 202, number 212, and number 215 bus routes link Blackrock to the city. The number 219 bus route links Blackrock to Bishopstown via Douglas on a southern orbital route that avoids the city centre.

== Sport ==
Ensign of Blackrock Sailing Club, established in 2017

Blackrock is home to Blackrock National Hurling Club (nicknamed The Rockies) which is located on Church Road. The Rockies are one of Ireland's most successful clubs, with 32 Senior Hurling Championship titles, 3 All-Ireland Senior Club Hurling Championships, 5 pre-1970 All-Ireland Titles and a number of notable inter-county hurlers over the years. Gaelic Football is played at St Michael's (nicknamed The Dazzlers) which has its playing pitches in Mahon.

The Beaumont area of Blackrock is home to the under-age section of Avondale United. Blackrock is also home to Blackrock Karate club and St. Michaels Tennis Club. There is also a lawn and indoor bowls club next to the tennis club's grounds on Church Road. Blackrock has long been a centre of rowing and is home to Cork Boat Club, with the Lee Rowing Club and Shandon Rowing Club also nearby.

== Notable residents ==
George Boole, inventor of Boolean algebra (the basis of modern computer arithmetic) lived in Ballintemple during his time as Professor of Mathematics at University College Cork. Boole is buried in the grounds of St. Michael's Church of Ireland on Church Road.

Architect Thomas Deane built a home on the grounds of Dundanion Castle, and his architect son and grandson (Thomas Newenham Deane and Thomas Manly Deane) also lived in the area.

Labour Party politician Timothy Quill also lived in Blackrock.
