= Dundanion Castle =

Tudor tower house in Cork, Ireland

- Dún Daingean (Irish)
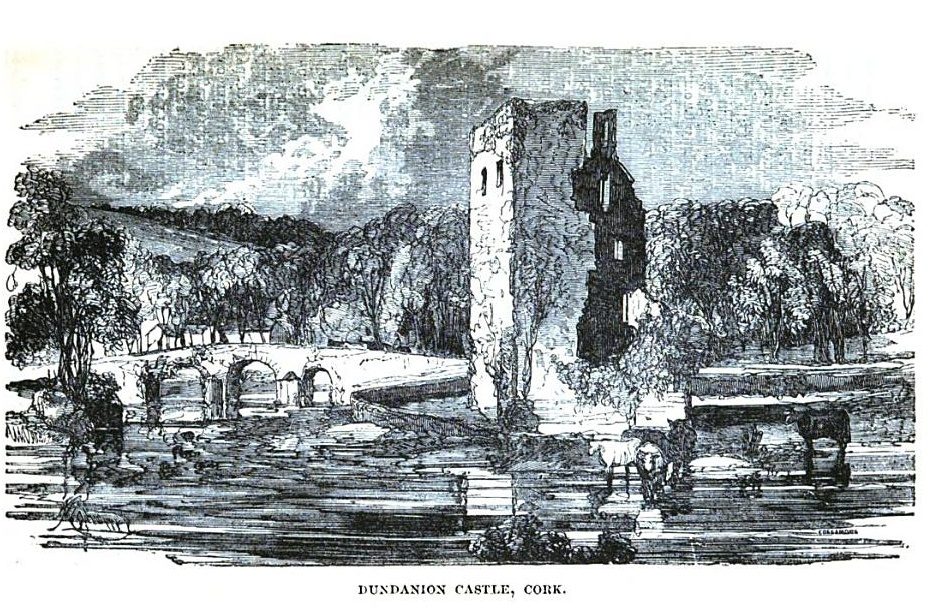
- 19th century engraving of Dundanion Castle

- Dundanion Castle in Ireland
- 51.8974°N 8.4204°W

History
- Built: c. 1564
- Built for: Galwey family

Site notes
- Area: Blackrock, Cork, Ireland
- Architectural style: Fortified limestone tower house

Dundanion Castle (Irish: Dún Daingean, meaning 'firm fortress') is a Tudor tower house in the Blackrock area of Cork in Ireland. Previously known as Galwey's Castle, the ruin is located on the grounds of the much later "Dundanion House".

== History ==
Though built on or close to the site of an earlier structure, the existing limestone ruin dates to c.1564. Built by the Galwey family, the castle is marked (as "Galwaies castle") on the Pacata Hibernia map of Cork which dates to the late 16th century.

Owing to later land reclamation, the castle is now located some distance from the waterfront of the River Lee. However, an adjoining slipway demonstrates an earlier use, and some sources ascribe the castle as William Penn's departure point on one of his voyages to the Americas ahead of the founding of Pennsylvania in the 1680s.

The castle changed hands several times before falling into ruin. Several grand houses were built in the castle demesne before architect, Sir Thomas Deane built "Dundanion House" in the 1830s. Contemporary Deane family diaries mention stonemasons making "a ‘picturesque ruin'" of Dundanion Castle during the construction of Dundanion House.

Though partly visible from the public walkway of the old Cork, Blackrock and Passage Railway and from nearby Holland Park, the castle ruin itself lies on the grounds of Dundanion House, which is private property and not publicly accessible. The castle is listed by Cork City Council as a protected structure (PS492), and it is included on the Irish national Record of Monuments and Places (CO 074-049).
