= O'Shea and Whelan =

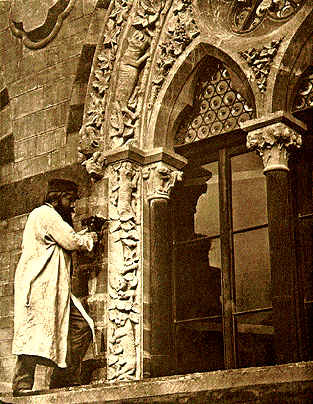
James O'Shea at work on carvings for the Oxford Museum of Natural History

O'Shea and Whelan was an Irish family practice of stonemasons and sculptors from Ballyhooly in County Cork. They were notable for their involvement in Ruskinian gothic architecture in the mid-19th century.

== Practice ==
The practice comprised the brothers James and John O'Shea, along with their nephew Edward Whelan. James and John were the sons of a craftsman who came to Cork to work on the construction of Convamore House, and who remained and set up a workshop in nearby Ballyhooly village. After his death the workshop was inherited by James and John, and is often referred to as "The O'Shea Brothers". However Whelan's role in the firm was equally significant. Nevertheless, James O'Shea was the most notable of the family. In addition to his work as an architectural mason he exhibited fine art sculptures in the classical style.

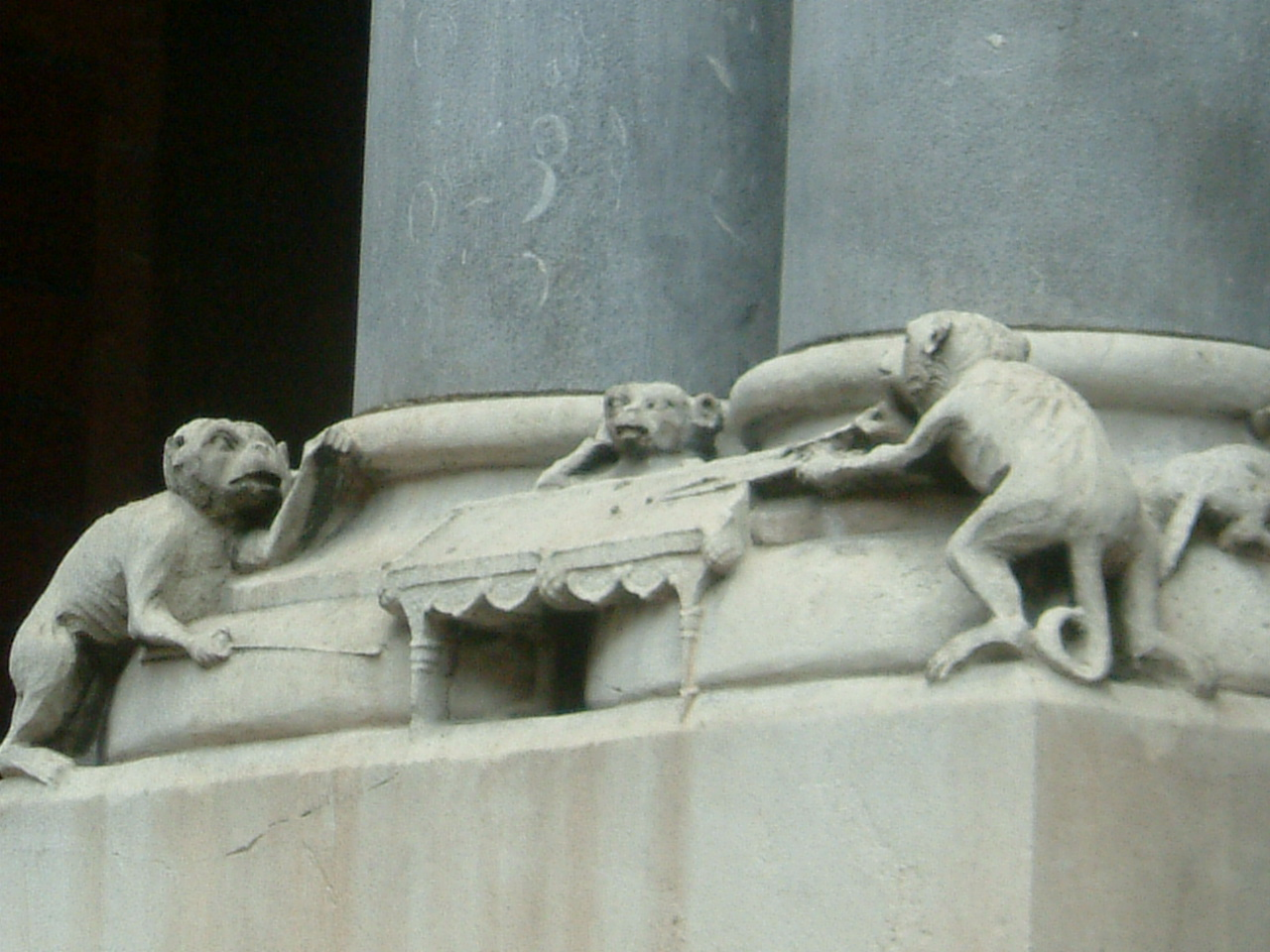
The billiard-playing monkeys in the Kildare Street Club, Dublin

The O'Sheas initially achieved notability for their floral carvings and grotesqueries on buildings in Dublin, in particular at Trinity College and at the Kildare Street Club, including the famous window piece showing the club members as monkeys playing billiards.

== Work with Ruskin ==
At the time John Ruskin was seeking to revive lively freehand stone carving of the kind typical of medieval Gothic architecture. The architects Thomas Newenham Deane and Benjamin Woodward were proposing to work with Ruskin on the design of the new Oxford University Museum of Natural History. Woodward, who had worked with them in Dublin, brought in the O'Sheas as the best qualified carvers for the job. The O'Sheas worked in tandem with Ruskin and the architects to produce a series of elaborate carvings of plant and animal forms. Each was a unique and individual design.

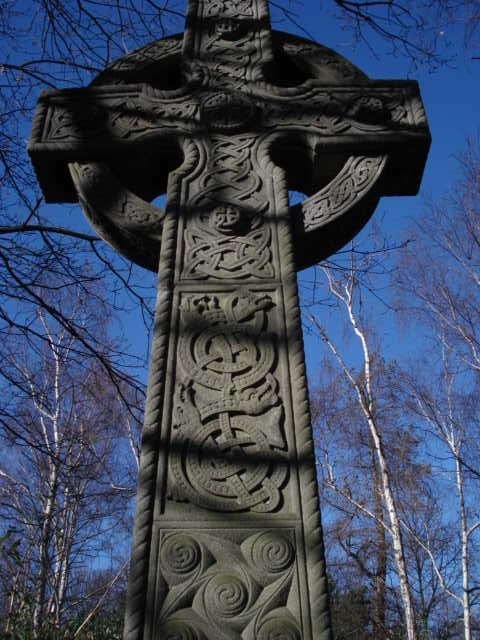
Celtic Cross in memory of Talbot Baines Reed

James O'Shea also attempted to establish himself as a fine artist with Ruskin's help, though Ruskin eventually declared himself "disappointed" with the carver's work. Ruskin later claimed that "the delight in the freedom and power which would have been the elements of all health to a trained workman were destruction to him...I hoped he would find his way in time, but hoped, as so often, in vain."

Further problems arose when the Convocation of the university refused to pay for more carvings, which had largely been funded by public subscriptions. When the O'Sheas offered to work without pay, some members of Convocation accused them of "defacing" the building with unauthorised work. According to Henry Acland, the professor who liaised with Ruskin, James O'Shea proceeded to carve caricatures of members of Convocation on the entrance of the building in the form of parrots and owls. Acland forced him to remove the heads, which remain defaced to this day.

== Other projects ==
The O'Sheas also worked on several other projects. One of the O'Sheas carved statues for St Mary's church in Rhyl, Wales. One also worked for the architect J.F. Bentley, who described his attitude as "unbearable". Thomas Deane later employed Whelan to work in Oxford on the Meadow Building and at the Fleet Street Crown Life Office.

Thomas Woolner, a sculptor also involved in the Oxford project, employed James O'Shea to create carvings for his home. The O'Sheas and Whelan went on to work with Woolner and the architect Alfred Waterhouse in the design of the Manchester assize courts, producing a series of capitals depicting gruesome forms of punishment in history. Though the original building was demolished following bomb damage in World War Two, the carvings survive in the replacement building.

James O'Shea returned to Ireland to work in Callan as a monumental sculptor, specialising in Celtic crosses and establishing a new firm with his son Edward. A fine example of this work is the Celtic cross in memory of the children's author Talbot Baines Reed, which stands at Abney Park Cemetery in Stoke Newington, London.

== In drama ==
John Purser's radio play, Parrots and Owls, commissioned by BBC Scotland and Radio 3, dramatising the controversy over the satirical stone carvings around the Oxford museum's entrance, was broadcast in 1994, with Seán McGinley in the role of James O'Shea.
