= Keith Stewart Thomson =

- Born: September 27, 1938 (age 87); Derbyshire, United Kingdom
- Education: University of Birmingham; Harvard University
- Occupations: Natural history professor, author

Keith Stewart Thomson (born 1938; B.SC. Birmingham, AM, Ph.D. Harvard) was from 2003 to 2012 a senior research fellow of the American Philosophical Society and is, starting in 2012, the Executive Officer of the American Philosophical Society and is an emeritus professor of natural history at the University of Oxford. He was appointed director of the Oxford University Museum of Natural History in July 1998. In 1987 he was appointed president of the Academy of Natural Sciences in Philadelphia. He had earlier been a dean at Yale University and director of Yale's Peabody Museum of Natural History. He is the author of several books and essays that deal with paleontology, the history of science and evolution.

== Bibliography ==
- Thomson, Keith Stewart (1988). Morphogenesis and evolution. Oxford [Oxfordshire]: Oxford University Press. ISBN 0-19-504912-8.
- Thomson, Keith Stewart (1991). Living fossil: the story of the coelacanth. New York: W.W. Norton. ISBN 0-393-30868-5.
- Thomson, Keith Stewart (1993). The common but less frequent loon and other essays. New Haven, Conn: Yale University Press. ISBN 0-300-06654-6.
- Thomson, Keith Stewart (1995). HMS Beagle: the story of Darwin's ship. New York: W.W. Norton. ISBN 0-393-03778-9.
- Thomson, Keith Stewart (2002). Treasures on Earth: Museums, Collections and Paradoxes. London: Faber and Faber. ISBN 0-571-21295-6.
- Thomson, Keith Stewart (2005). Fossils: A Very Short Introduction. Oxford [Oxfordshire]: Oxford University Press. ISBN 978-0-19-280504-1.
- Thomson, Keith Stewart (2007). Before Darwin: Reconciling God and Nature. New Haven, Conn: Yale University Press. ISBN 978-0-300-12600-6.
- Thomson, Keith Stewart (2008). The Legacy of the Mastodon: The Golden Age of Fossils in America. New Haven, Conn: Yale University Press. ISBN 978-0-300-11704-2.
- Thomson, Keith Stewart (2009). The Young Charles Darwin. New Haven, Conn: Yale University Press. ISBN 978-0-300-13608-1.
- Thomson, Keith (2012). Jefferson's Shadow. Yale University Press. ISBN 978-0300187403.
