= Thomas Manly Deane =

Irish architect

Sir Thomas Manly Deane (8 June 1851 – 3 February 1933) was an Irish architect, the son of Sir Thomas Newenham Deane and grandson of Sir Thomas Deane, who were also architects.

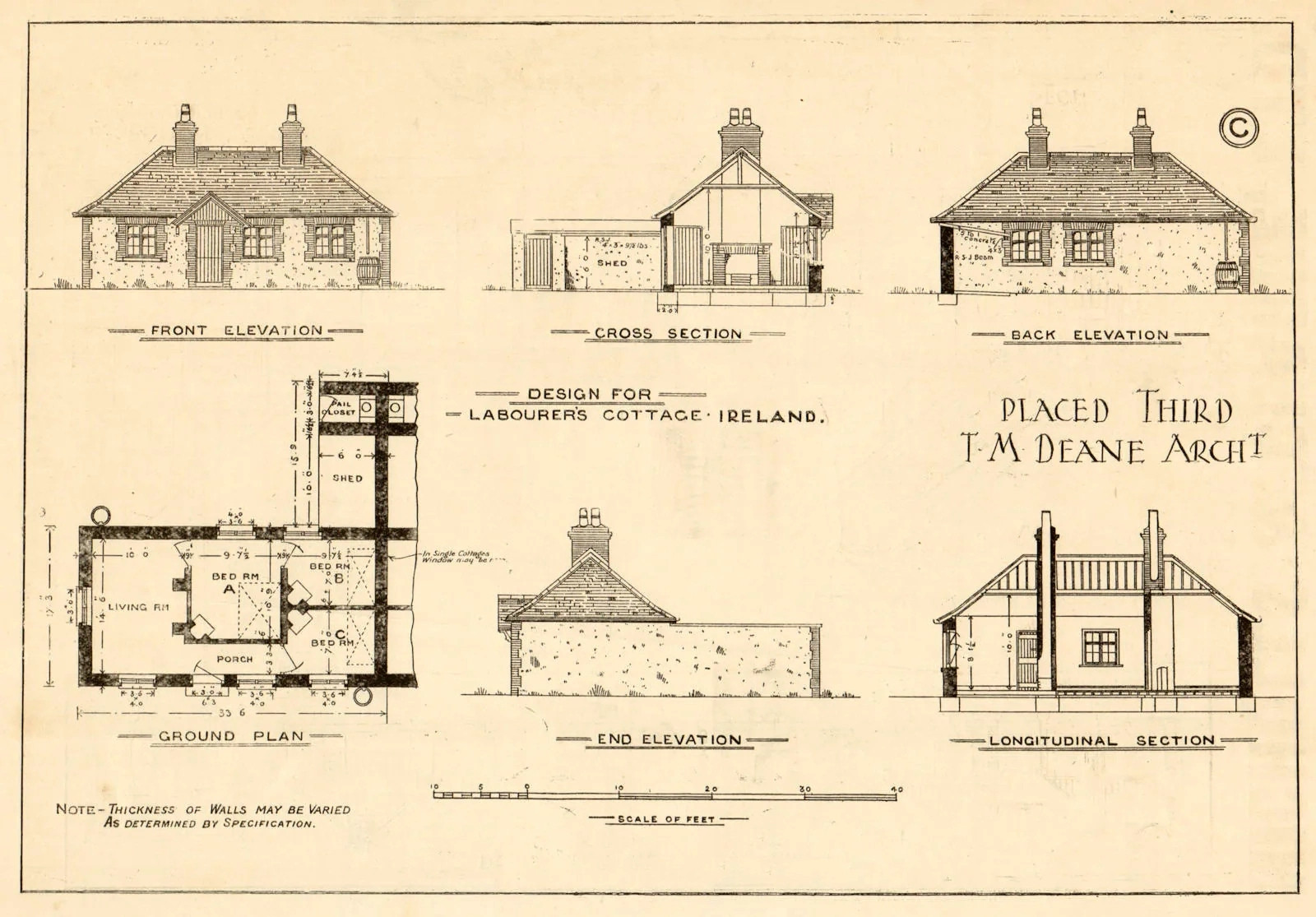
Deane's design for "Labourer's cottage - Ireland", dated 1907

Born at Ferney House, Blackrock, Cork, on 8 June 1851, he was educated at Trinity College, Dublin, and travelled in France and Italy before joining his father's practice in 1878. Deane later went into partnership with his father from 1884 until his father's death in 1899, when he joined Sir Aston Webb. He designed three buildings of note in Dublin: the National Museum and National Library on Kildare Street and also in the 1937 Reading Room in Trinity College Dublin. Deane was knighted in 1911. He died in Wales on 3 February 1933, aged 81.
