= Benjamin Woodward =

Irish architect

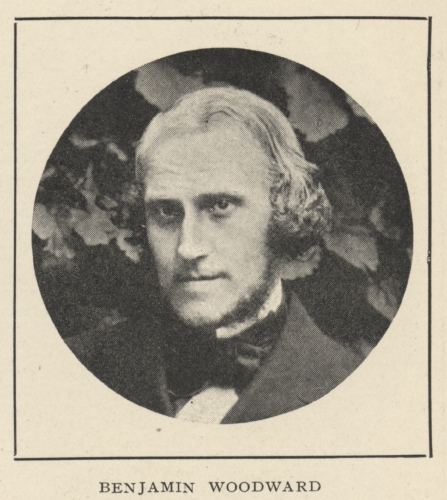
- Born: 16 November 1816; Tullamore, County Offaly, Ireland
- Died: 15 May 1861 (aged 44); Lyons, France
- Occupation: Architect
- Buildings: Kildare Street Club, Oxford University Museum of Natural History

Benjamin Woodward (16 November 1816 – 15 May 1861) was an Irish architect who, in partnership with Sir Thomas Newenham Deane, designed a number of buildings in Dublin, Cork and Oxford.

== Life ==
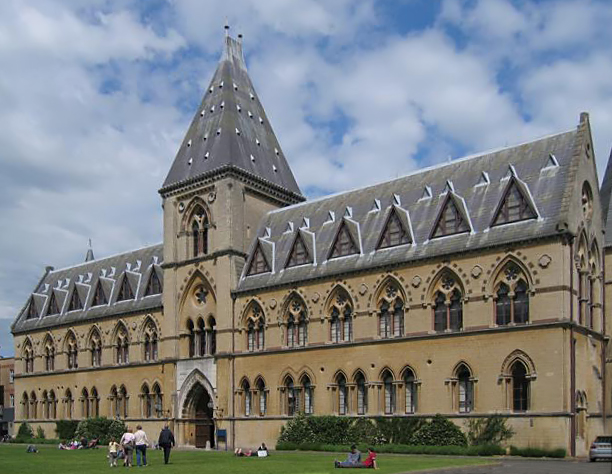
Oxford University Museum of Natural History, built 1854-1860

Woodward was born in Tullamore, County Offaly, Ireland on 16 November 1816. He was the seventh child of Mary née Atkinson (died 1824) and Captain Charles Woodward (1781–1864), formerly of the Royal Meath Militia. He trained as an engineer but developed an interest in medieval architecture, producing measured drawings of Holy Cross Abbey in County Tipperary. These drawings were exhibited at the RIBA in London in 1846.

The same year he joined the office of Sir Thomas Deane and became a partner in 1851 along with Deane's son, Thomas Newenham Deane. It seems that Deane looked after business matters, and left the design work to Woodward.

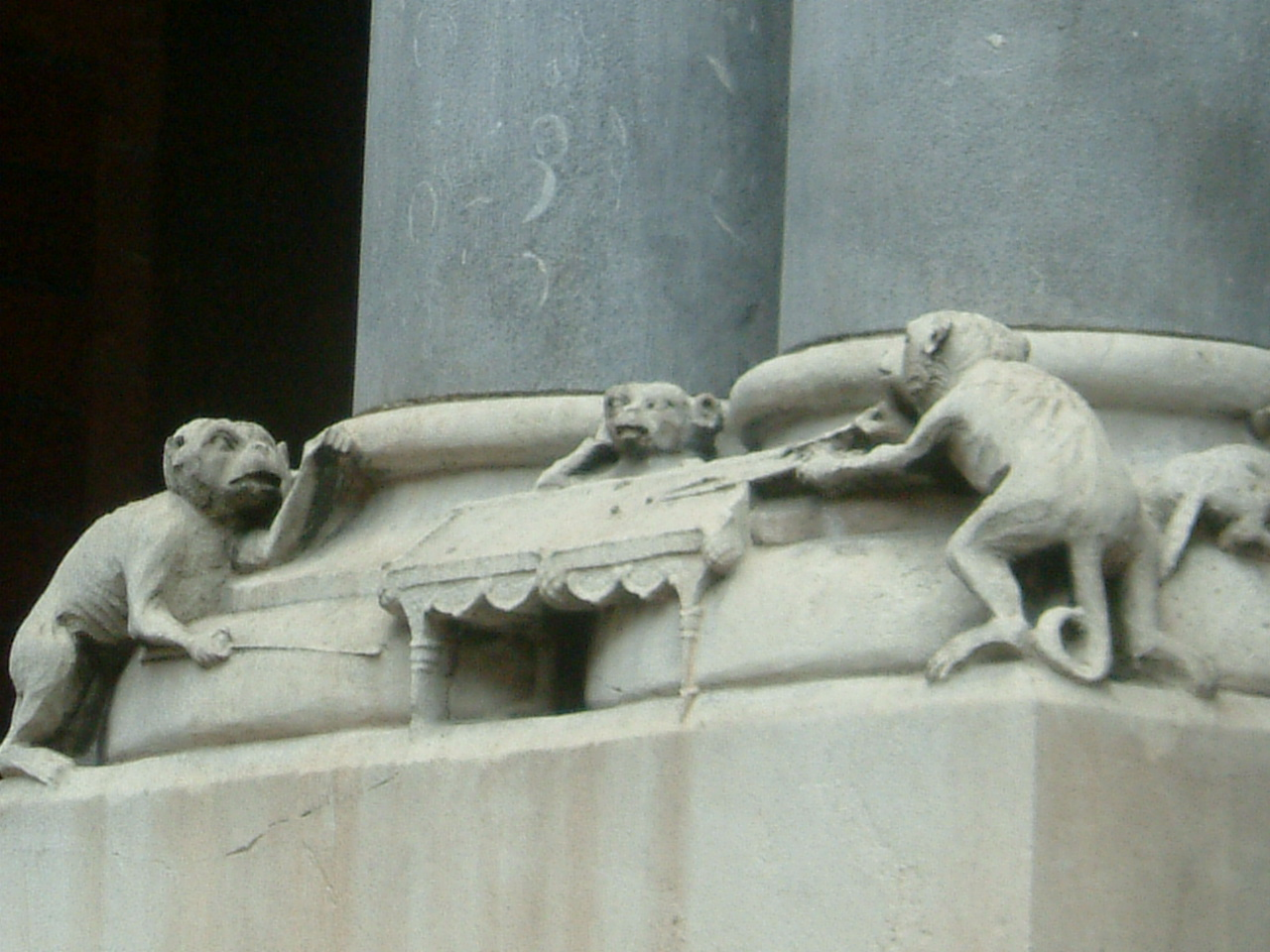
The billiard-playing monkeys in the Kildare Street Club

Woodward's two most important buildings are the Museum at Trinity College, Dublin (1854-1857) and the Oxford University Museum of Natural History, Oxford, (1854-1860). He was also responsible for the Kildare Street Club in Dublin (1858-1861) and Queen's College Cork, now University College Cork, (1845-1849).

The work of Deane and Woodward is characterised by naturalistic decoration with foliage and animals carved into capitals and plinths around windows and doors. It was praised by John Ruskin in particular when he visited the Museum at Trinity College. Woodward collaborated in particular with the O'Shea brothers. James and John O'Shea were stone carvers from County Cork. They, along with London sculptors, carved the abundant decorative stonework at Trinity, showing owls, lizards, cats and monkeys, as well as other flora and fauna.

Later the O'Sheas carved stonework at the Kildare Street Club, including the famous window piece showing the club members as monkeys playing billiards. Woodward shared Ruskin’s ideal of wanting the Oxford Museum to mark a return to the Gothic tradition of enriching the structural forms with naturalistic symbolism – drawing inspiration from real plants and animals. To realise this he was willing to let his craftsmen improvise their own solutions to problems, just as mediaeval stonemasons apparently did. Despite suffering from the tuberculosis that was to kill him in 1861, Woodward quickly became a charismatic presence in Oxford, as William Tuckwell recalled: "Then into our midst came Woodward … a man of rare genius and deep artistic knowledge, beautiful in face and character, but with the shadow of an early death already stealing over him."

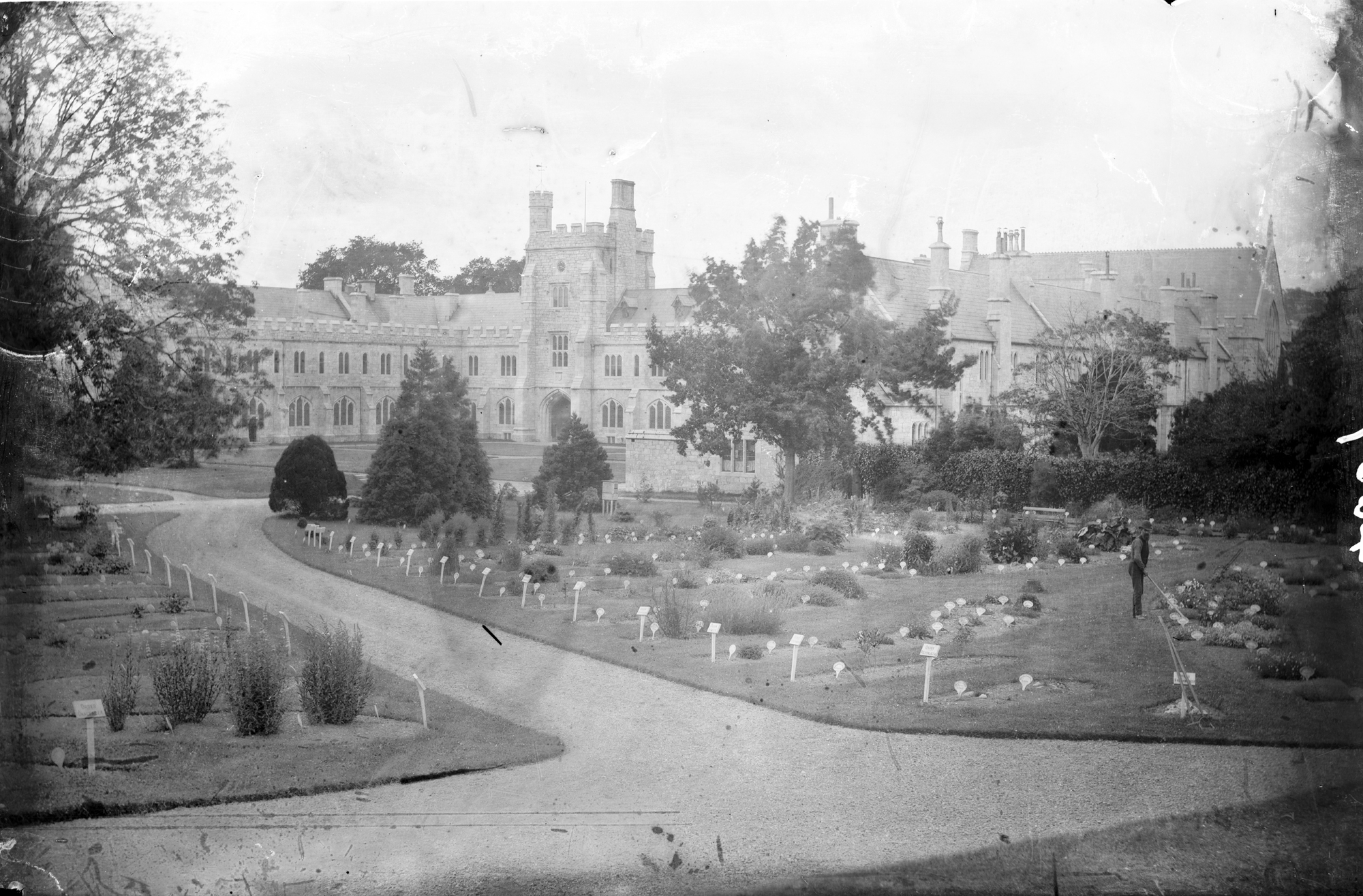
Queen's College Cork, now University College Cork

Among his admirers were Gabriel Rossetti, Burne-Jones, and William Morris and while in Oxford he was also commissioned to design the new Oxford Union building, upon which the Pre-Raphaelites were to become famously involved in painting the frescoes. Woodward brought with him from Ireland a team of carvers and stonemasons, who lived in a temporary camp erected at the site which included an institute, complete with reading room and lecture hall. It was here that Ruskin addressed the workmen in April 1856, setting out his theories of Gothic architecture and the creative role of the ordinary craftsmen in making it a reality.

Woodward died of tuberculosis trying to return to Ireland from the French Riviera in the Hôtel de l'Univers on rue de Bourbon, Lyon on 15 May 1861. He was buried in the Cimetière de Loyasse.
