= Thomas Deane =

Irish architect (1792–1871)

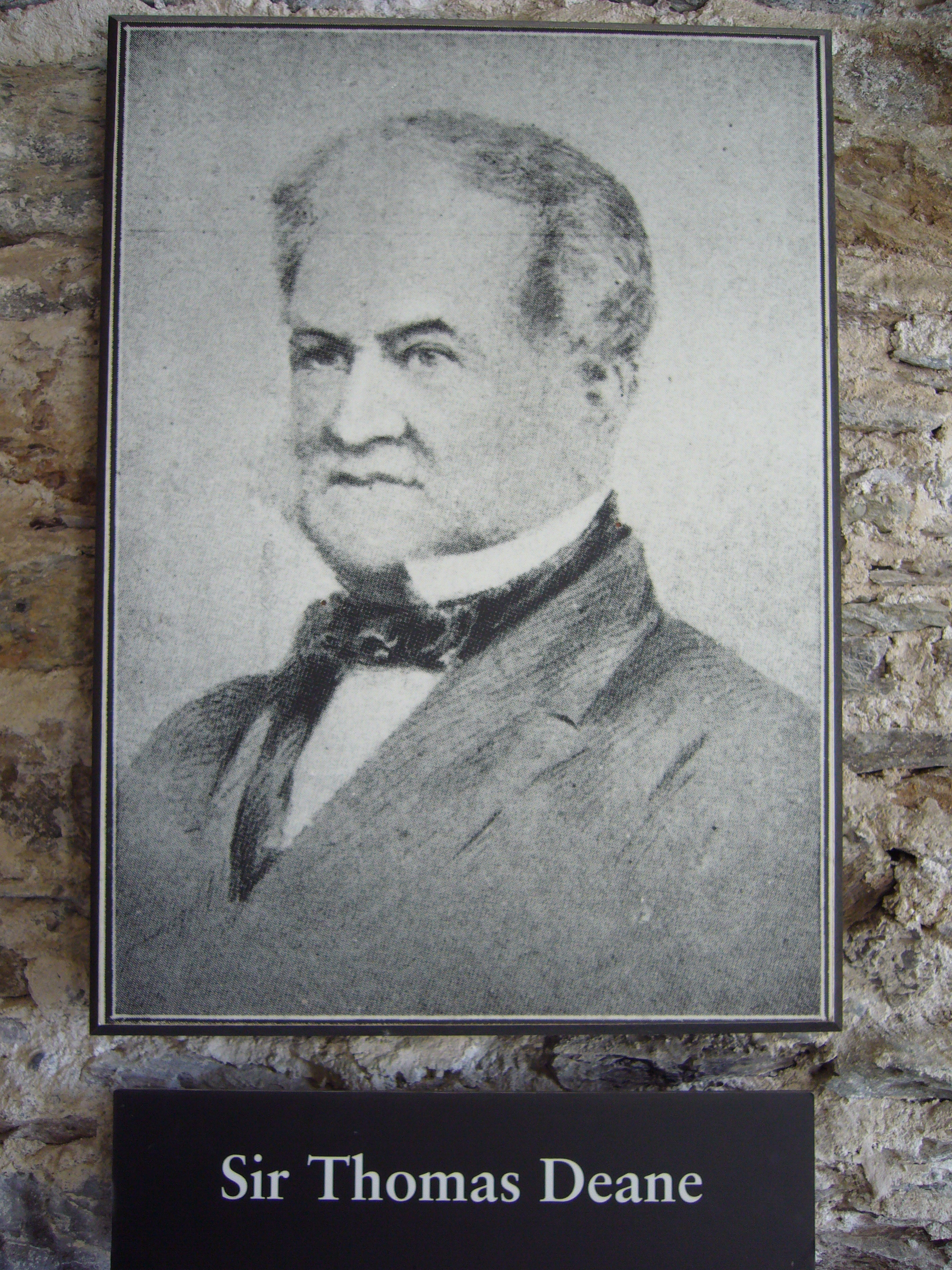
Sir Thomas Deane

Sir Thomas Deane (Cork, 1792 – Dublin, 1871) was an Irish architect. He was the father of Sir Thomas Newenham Deane, and grandfather of Sir Thomas Manly Deane, who were also architects.

== Life ==
Thomas Deane was born in Cork, the eldest son of Alexander Deane, a builder, and Elizabeth Sharpe. His grandparents and uncle were also builders and architects, and had married into families of the same professions, the Kearns and Hargraves.

Deane's Estate Act 1808
- Act of Parliament
- Parliament of the United Kingdom
- Long title: An Act to enable the Executrix and Executors in Trust of the Will of Alexander Deane to grant Leases of Lands and Grounds in the City of Cork, and in the Liberties of the said City, and to apply the Rents and Profits thereof to the Uses of the said Will.
- Citation: 48 Geo. 3. c. 73 Pr.

Dates
- Royal assent: 30 June 1808

His father died in 1806, leaving his mother with seven children to bring up. There was a flaw in his will, which prevented Mrs. Deane from acquiring the properties that he owned in Cork city, and a private act of Parliament, Deane's Estate Act 1808 (48 Geo. 3. c. 73 Pr.) was required to enable her to gain the leases of the properties. Mrs. Deane continued the family business, and Thomas started work there at fourteen years of age. In 1811 he designed his first building, the Cork Commercial Buildings, on South Mall, won in competition against William Wilkins (1778–1839).

Deane was to the forefront of the development of the arts and sciences in his native city. He served on Cork Corporation for many years. He was Mayor of Cork in 1815, 1830 and 1851, and was knighted in 1830. He was a staunch Tory, but ended up supporting a Catholic, Daniel Callaghan, in 1830. Later in life he grew tired of the political in-fighting.

In 1820, he bought the Ummera Estate in County Cork, and later bought and renovated a Georgian house at Dundanion close to Blackrock.

In 1849, Deane commissioned local Cork sculptor Patrick J. Scannell to create a statue of Queen Victoria for Queen's College, Cork which was due to open in October of that year. Deane presented the statue to the college as a personal gift to the new institution, and it was erected on top of a prominent building in August 1849 while Queen Victoria herself was visiting Cork on her first official state visit to Ireland. The Cork Examiner described her pleasure at the scene:

At the moment the carriages passed the college the sustaining wedges were withdrawn, and, amidst the discharge of cannon, a statue of her Majesty, presented to the college authorities by Sir Thomas Deane, was suddenly erected on the apex of the most conspicuous gable. By the removal of the wedges large obstacles that interfered with distinct view of this structure, were, to a certain extent, removed, and the Royal standard was seen waving in the air; and under it the expressive banners of the various trades employed in its erection. The sight of this interesting spectacle induced her Majesty to stop the progress of the carriages for a moment, during which time she appeared highly pleased at this gratifying commemoration of her first visit.

Deane designed a number of buildings in the city of Cork, including parts of the University College campus, and St Mary's Cathedral, Tuam (completed after his death, in 1878).

In 1860, he moved to Dublin, buying a house in Longford Terrace in Monkstown. He was elected President of the Royal Hibernian Academy in 1866 and served as president of the Royal Institute of the Architects of Ireland from 1868 to 1870.

He had two children by his first marriage: Julia and John Connellan Deane. Julia died in 1863. John was educated at Midleton College, Cork, and matriculated in 1831 at Trinity College, Dublin, at the age of sixteen. He had to be rescued from debt a number of occasions during his youth. He trained for the bar at the King's Inn in Dublin and Gray's Inn in London. During the Famine he was a Poor Law inspector in County Donegal and Galway. He came up with the idea of the Art Treasures Exhibition in Manchester in 1857. He died at Posillipo, Naples, on 24 February 1887 and was buried in the English Cemetery, Naples.

By his second marriage, to Eliza, Thomas had three children: Thomas Newenham, born 15 June 1828, Susanna Adelaide (Ada), born 1837, and Olivia Louise, born 1838.

Professional and academic associations
| Preceded by Sir Charles Lanyon | President of the Royal Institute of the Architects of Ireland; 1868–1870 | Succeeded by James Higgins Owen |
