= Thomas Newenham Deane =

Irish architect (1828–99)

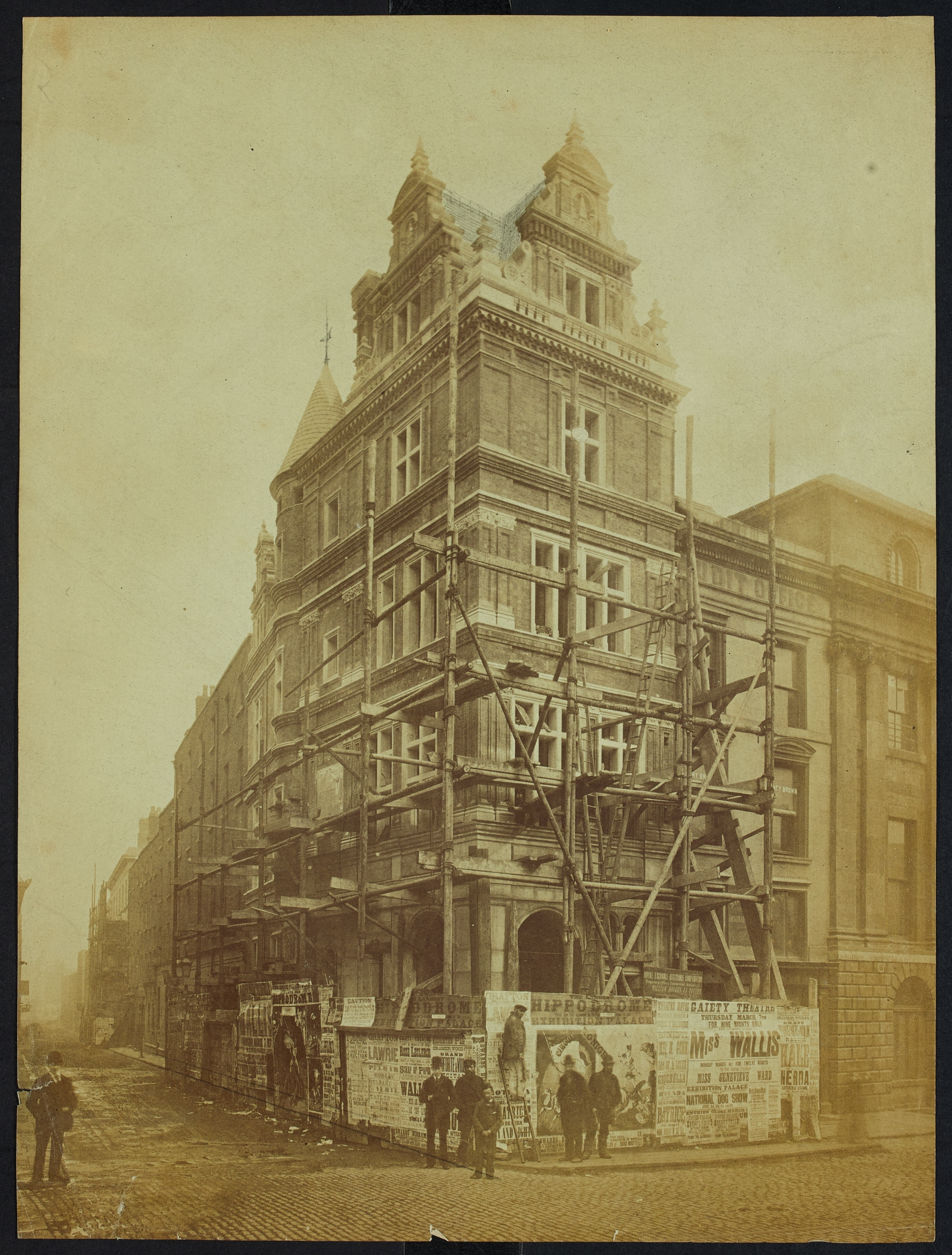
Offices of the Royal Exchange Assurance Company at 5 College Green, designed by Deane, while under construction between 1878 and 1880

Sir Thomas Newenham Deane (1828 – 8 November 1899) was an Irish architect, the son of Sir Thomas Deane and Eliza Newenham, and the father of Sir Thomas Manly Deane. His father and son were also architects.

Works attributed to Thomas Newenham Deane, and his architectural practice, include the National Library of Ireland, a wing of the National Gallery of Ireland, St Mary's Cathedral, Tuam, the Kildare Street Club, and a number of buildings in the Trinity College Dublin campus.

== Early life ==
Sir Thomas Newenham Deane was born on the 15 of June in 1828 near Cork, Ireland. He was the son of Sir Thomas Deane, an architect, and Eliza O’Callaghan Newenham, Sir Thomas Deane's second wife. Deane was born as the oldest of 3 siblings. As the only son Deane had two younger sisters, Susanna Adelaide (Ada) and Olivia Louisa. From his father's first marriage the three siblings had a step-brother John Connellan and a step-sister Julia Connellan. Deane is described as being a shy and reserved child who struggled with a stammer. The firm had grown to become a successful business and one of the most prominent practises in Ireland. Deane was schooled in England in the public Rugby School. During his childhood, he had inherited an interest in sailing from his father. This led to one of his earliest aspirations in wanting to eventually join the navy. This aspiration was nonetheless denied by his father, and following primary school in England, Deane, in 1846, travelled back to Ireland to attend Trinity College Dublin (TCD). In 1849 he graduated from TCD with a BA. A year after graduation, Deane moved back to Cork where he married Henrietta Manly. While Deane after graduation had explored the possibility of making a living as an artist, he instead entered his father's business initially working on drawings for Queens College Cork, now University College Cork.

Throughout his youth, Deane showed an interest in painting, especially painting with watercolours. And immediately after graduating from TCD, he worked towards establishing himself as an artist. This he did despite his father Sir Thomas Deane's lack of approval. Sir Thomas Deane instead saw his son's future as being in the family business. As years went on, Deane became a more integrated part of the architecture firm, a practice he officially joined in 1850 and later was to take over after his father died in 1871. Throughout his career, Deane never dropped his interest in arts and was a firm believer in architecture would improve by combining education in architecture with studies of fine arts. Towards the end of his life, he managed to become a regularly figured artist in the Royal Hibernian Academy in Dublin.

== Career ==
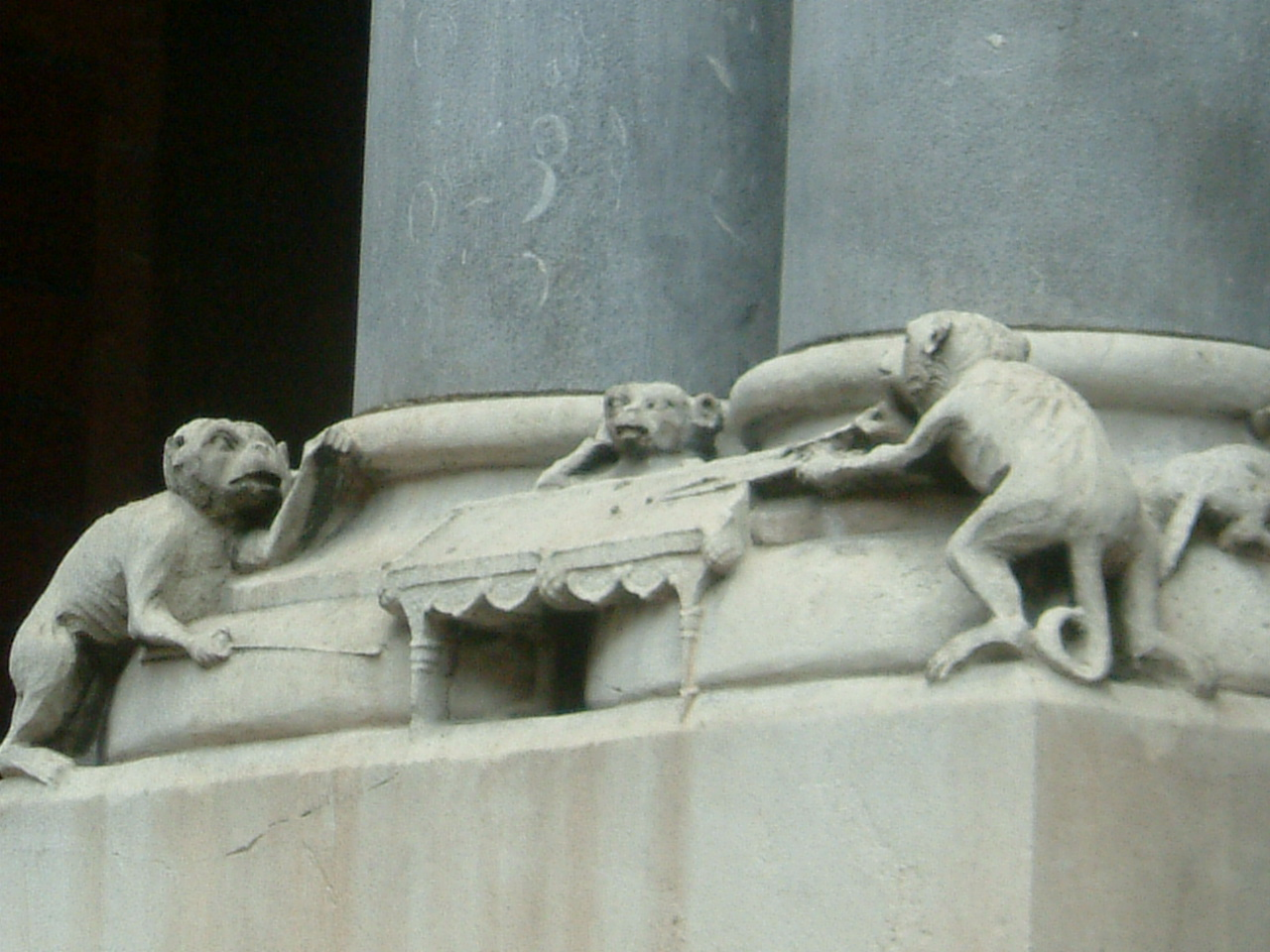
A carving of billiard-playing monkeys in the Kildare Street Club

In 1851, he became a partner along with Benjamin Woodward. Their work was primarily a Gothic style influenced by the principles of John Ruskin, and included the museum at Trinity College, Dublin, the Oxford University Museum of Natural History, the Pitt Rivers Museum, the Kildare Street Club in Dublin, and Queen's College Cork, now University College Cork. He was known as a conservation architect, involved in the restoration (including the incorporation of the original twelfth-century Romanesque chancel) of St Mary's Cathedral, Tuam.

His work on the conservation of St Canice's Cathedral, Kilkenny, was less successful and brought him into conflict with the dean and chapter, and in particular with the treasurer James Graves. It may have been his interest in the restoration of medieval buildings which led to his appointment as the first Inspector of National Monuments under the Irish Board of Works after the disestablishment of the Church of Ireland brought ruined buildings under their care. His work included St Cronan's Church of Ireland, Roscrea, County Tipperary.

In contemporary circles, Deane's partner Woodward was seen as the creative influence behind the business, and their practice suffered after his early death. Nevertheless, Deane continued to work with his son, Thomas Manly Deane, designing the National Museum of Ireland and National Library of Ireland in Kildare Street, Dublin.

Thomas Newenham Deane was knighted in 1890.

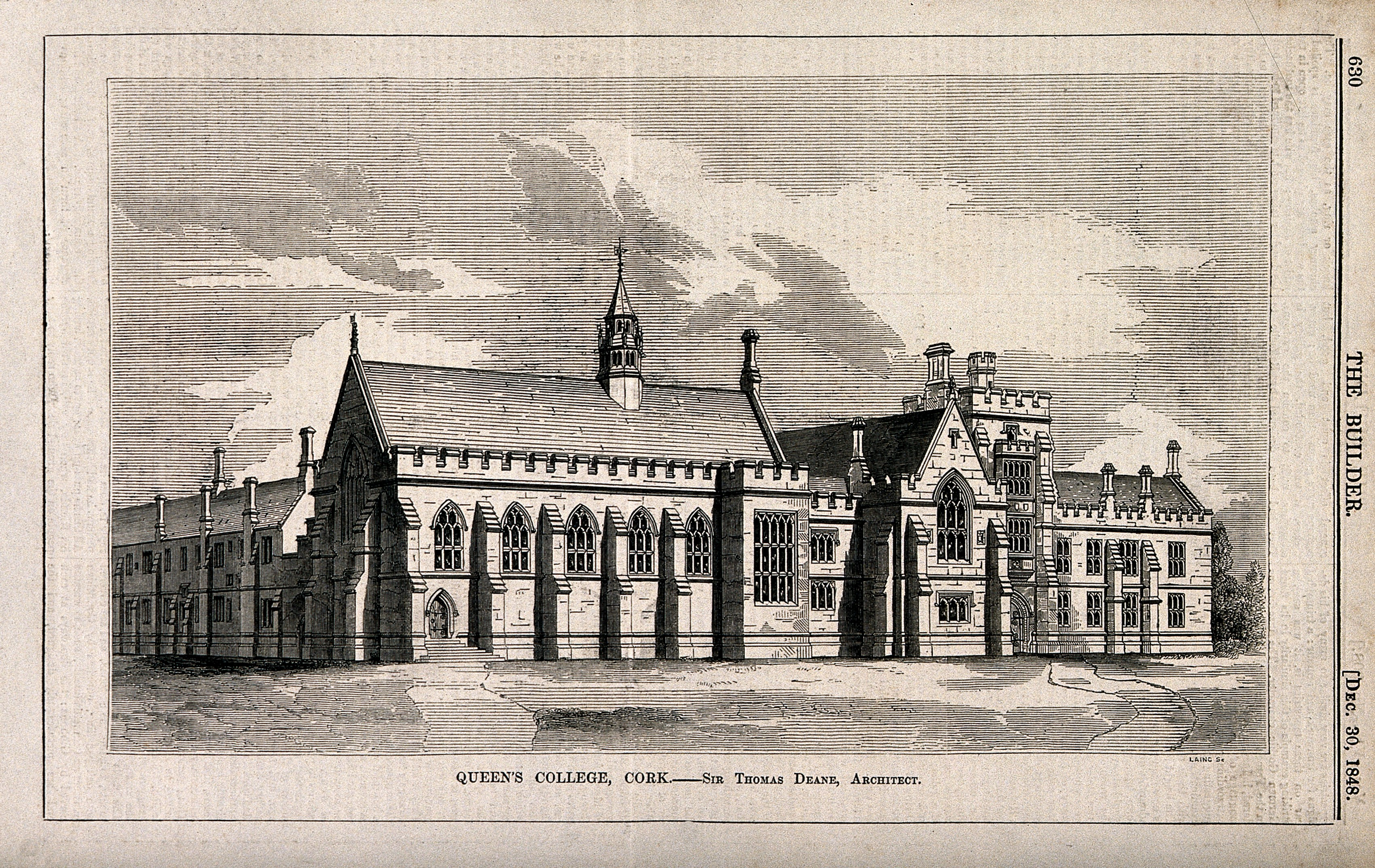
Queen's College Cork (now University College Cork) c. 1848 by JJ Laing

== Personal life ==
On 29 January 1850, Deane married Henrietta Manly, daughter of Joseph H. Manly of Ferney, County Cork. Deane and his wife had several children. Deane died suddenly in Dublin on 8 November 1899.
