= Elizabeth Edwards (historian) =

British anthropologist (born 1952)

Elizabeth Edwards FBA FRAI
- Born: Elizabeth Jane Mary Edwards; 1952 (age 73–74)
- Occupation: Historian
- Board member of: PHRC
- Awards: AAA Lifetime Achievement Award; J Dudley Johnston Award

Academic work
- Discipline: Anthropology
- Sub-discipline: Historical Anthropology; Visual anthropology
- Notable works: The Camera as Historian
- Website: Elizabeth Edwards publications on Academia.edu

Elizabeth Edwards, FBA (born 1952) is a British visual and historical anthropologist.

== Career ==
Edwards is Professor Emerita of Photographic History at De Montfort University, Curator Emerita at Pitt Rivers Museum, University of Oxford, Research Associate at the Institute of Social and Cultural Anthropology, University of Oxford, and Honorary Professor in the Department of Anthropology at University College London. In 2017 she was appointed the Andrew W. Mellon Visiting Professor at the V&A Research Institute, London. Her focus of research is the relationship between photography, history and anthropology, and includes investigations of photography and historical imagination, the social practices of photography, and the materiality of photographs.

Edwards was previously the Director of the Photographic History Research Centre (PHRC) at De Montfort University, and was the Curator of Photographs at Pitt Rivers Museum and lecturer in visual anthropology at the University of Oxford, and professor at the University of the Arts London. She was featured as one of the major writers on photography of all time in 'Fifty Key Writers on Photography'.

In 2015 Edwards was elected to Fellow of the British Academy. She was given a Lifetime Achievement Award by the Society for Visual Anthropology (American Anthropological Association) in 2014. Edwards is a Fellow of the Royal Anthropological Institute, and was its vice-president between 2009 and 2012. She is also a past Chair of the Museum Ethnographers Group. In 2020, Edwards was given the J Dudley Johnston Award of the Royal Photographic Society.

== Selected publications ==
- Edwards, Elizabeth (2014), "Between the Local, National, and Transnational: Photographic Recording and Memorializing Desire", in De Cesari, Chiara; Rigney, Ann (eds.), Transnational memory : circulation, articulation, scales, Berlin, ISBN 978-3110359022
- Edwards, Elizabeth (2014), "Photographic Uncertainties: Between Evidence and Reassurance", History and Anthropology, 25 (2), History and Anthropology: 171–188, doi:10.1080/02757206.2014.882834, ISSN 0275-7206, S2CID 144264460
- Durden, Mark, editor (2012), Fifty Key Writers on Photography, Key Guides, Routledge, ISBN 978-0415549448
- Edwards, Elizabeth (2012), The camera as historian: amateur photographers and historical imagination, 1885-1918, Objects/histories., Duke University Press, ISBN 978-0822351047
- Edwards, Elizabeth (2010), Raw histories : photographs, anthropology and museums, Materializing culture, Berg, ISBN 9781859734971
- Christopher Morton and Elizabeth Edwards, editors (2009), Photography, Anthropology and History: Expanding the Frame, Ashgate, ISBN 978-0-7546-9800-5
- Edwards, Elizabeth (1992), Anthropology and photography, 1860-1920, Yale University Press in association with the Royal Anthropological Institute, London, ISBN 9780300059441
