= Hans Kaarsberg =

Danish physician and writer (1854–1929)

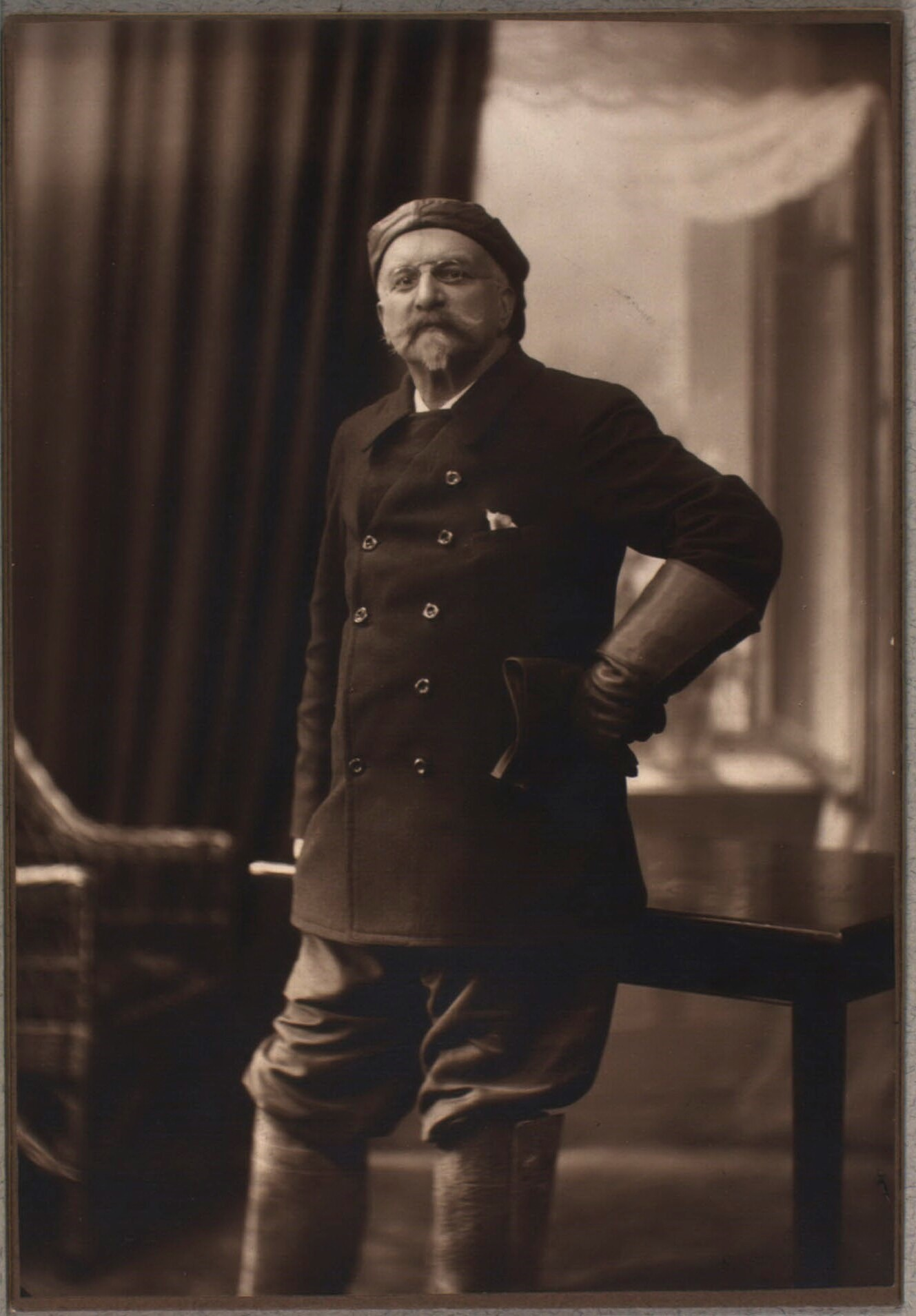
Portrait of Hans Karsberg.

Hans Kaarsberg (26 January 1854 – 16 March 1929) was a Danish medical doctor, writer and adventurer. In 1890, he went on a one-man expedition to Kalmykia in search of the last remains of the Kalmyk people. His account of the journey was published by Gyldendal in 1892. Among the Kalmyks of the Steppes on Horseback and by Troika: A Journey Made in 1890, an English-language translation of the book, was published by the Mongolian Society in 1996. In 2021. prompted by Kaarsberg Mysteriet, a five-episode DR podcast created by Klaus Rothstein. Kaarsberg attracted renewed attention for having inspired a young Karen Blixen's interest in travels, hunting and writing. Kaarsberg was the brother of surgeon Johannes Kaarsberg and author Ellen Reumert.

== Early life and education ==
Kaarsberg was born on 25 January 1854 in Græse, the son of Lutheran minister Hans Berlin Kaarsberg (1805–84) and Emma Elise Charlotte Hilda Reumert (1824–84). His father would later serve as pastor of Skælby and Gunderslev near Næstved. Kaarsberg was the brother of surgeon and titular professor Johannes Kaarsberg and author Ellen Reumert. Seven of his nine other siblings did not reach adulthood. He matriculated from Herlufsholm School in 1873 and earned a Master of Medicine degree from the University of Copenhagen in 1880.

== Career ==
=== Early career ===
Karsberg started his tenure as a general practitioner in first Skælby and then Glumsø. On various trips in Germany and Austria-Hungary, he made studies for his doctorate (on hernia) which he defended in 1889.

=== Three expeditions, 1890–1900 ===
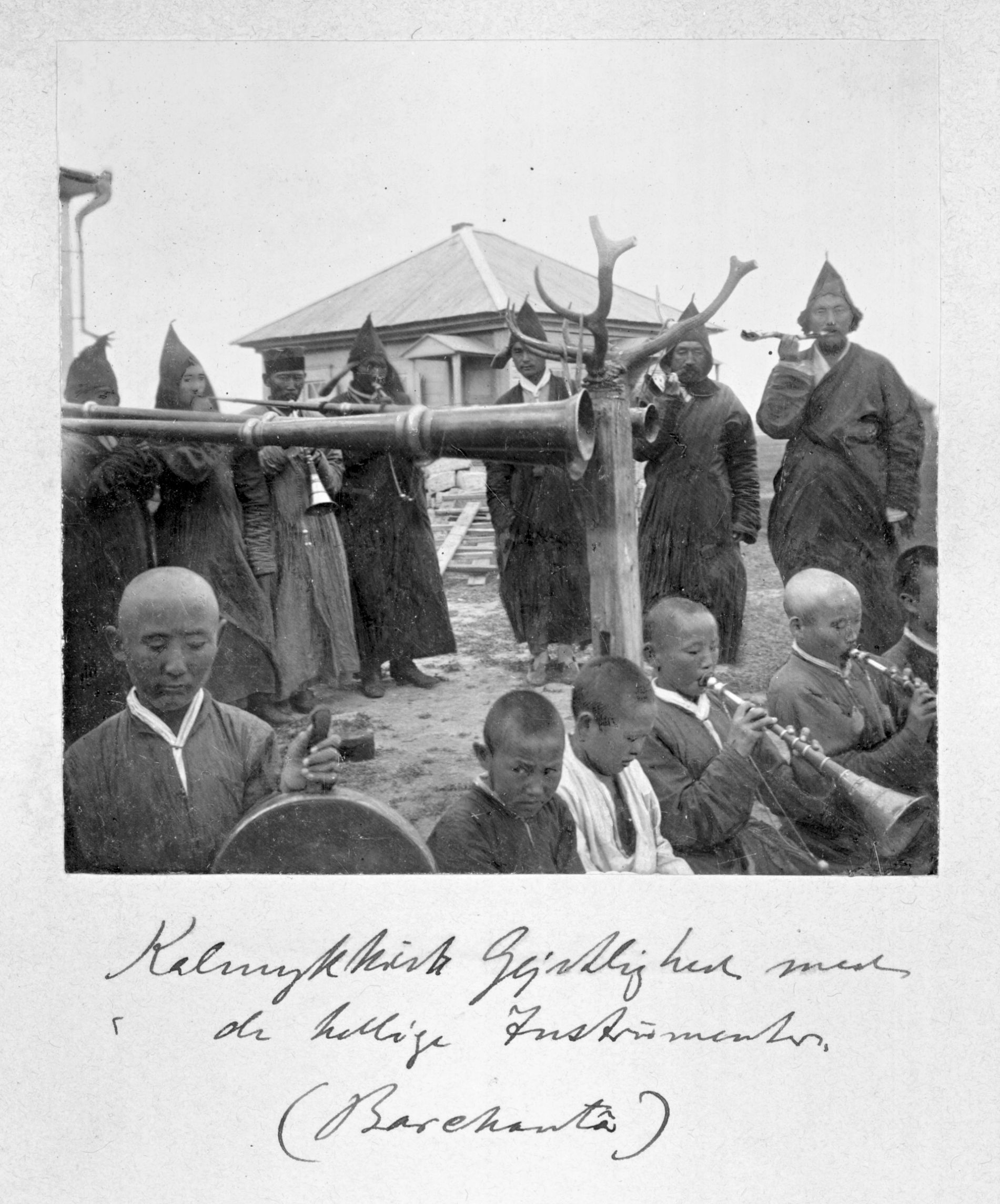
Kalmyks with holy instruments photographed by Kaarsberg, 1890.

To study the nosological and physical conditions of primitive peoples and to satisfy a personal apetite for adventure, he undertook three major one-man expeditions to rarely visited destinations. In 1890, he travelled to Kalmykia in search of the last remains of the Kalmyk people. He unsuccessfully tried to obtain funding for the journey from the Carlsberg Foundation through his uncle Japetus Steenstrup. Instead he ended up obtaining some funding from Gyldendal-owner Jacob Hegel on condition that he would produce a travel account about the expedition upon his return. He started out by travelling to Transcaucasia by way of Tunis, Athens, Asia Minor and Constantinople and then continued by way of Tiflis to the Kalmyks on the Kyrgyz steppes. His account of the journey was published under the title Gjennem Stepperne og blandt Kalmykkerne til Hest og med Trespand (Gyldendal, 1892).

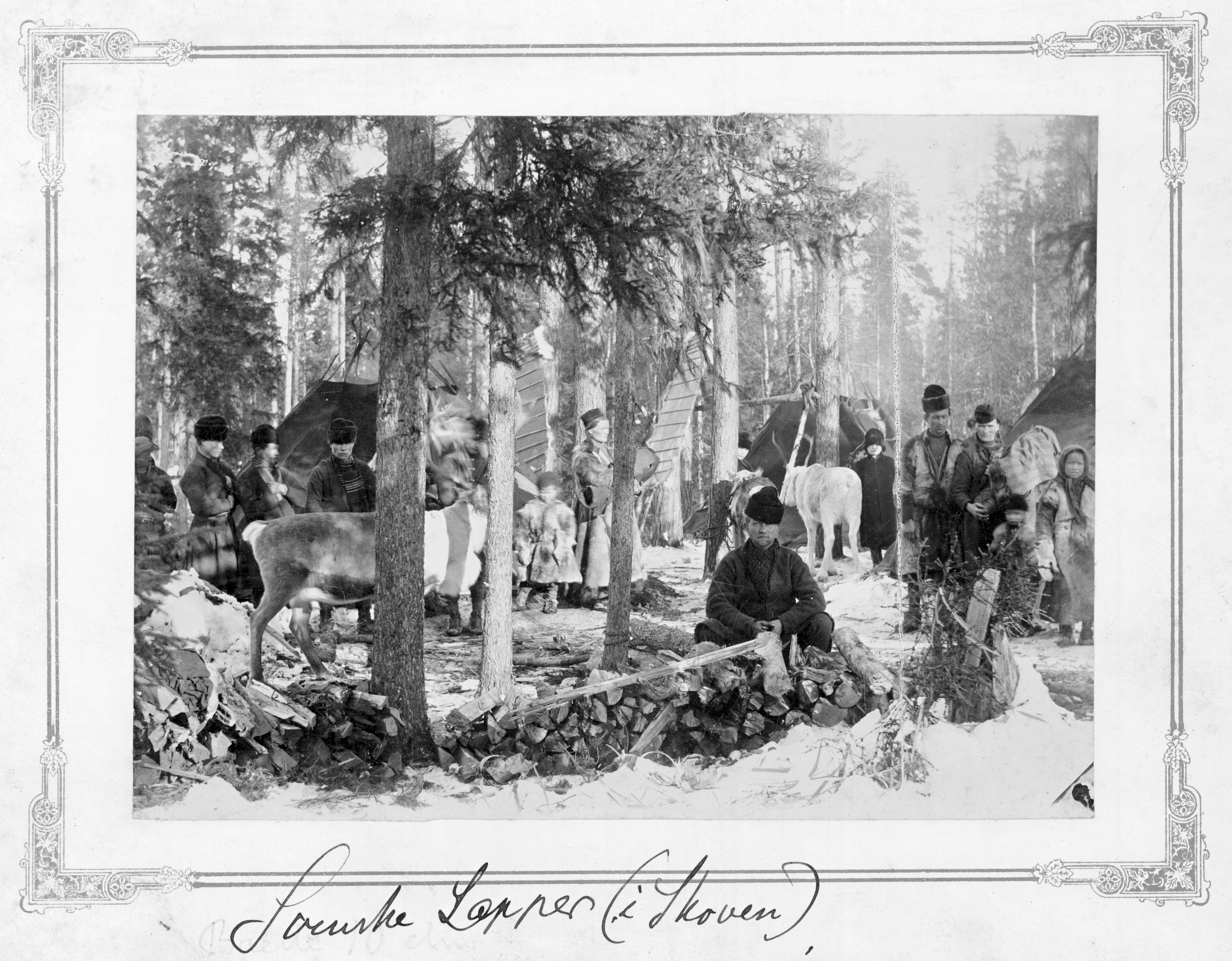
Sami people photographed by Kaarsberg.

In 1894, he travelled to Swedish Lapland to visit the Sami people. An account of the journey was published as Nordens sidste Nomade. Studier og Billeder fra svensk Lapmark nord for Polarkresen (1897)

In 1899, he went on a journey to the land of the Kuban Cossacks.

=== Physician in Sorø ===
After returning from the last journey, he became district and hospital doctor in Sorø in 1899 and county doctor in 1915. In 1903, he was responsible for overseeing the construction of the new Sorø Hospital. He retired in 1927.

== Writings ==
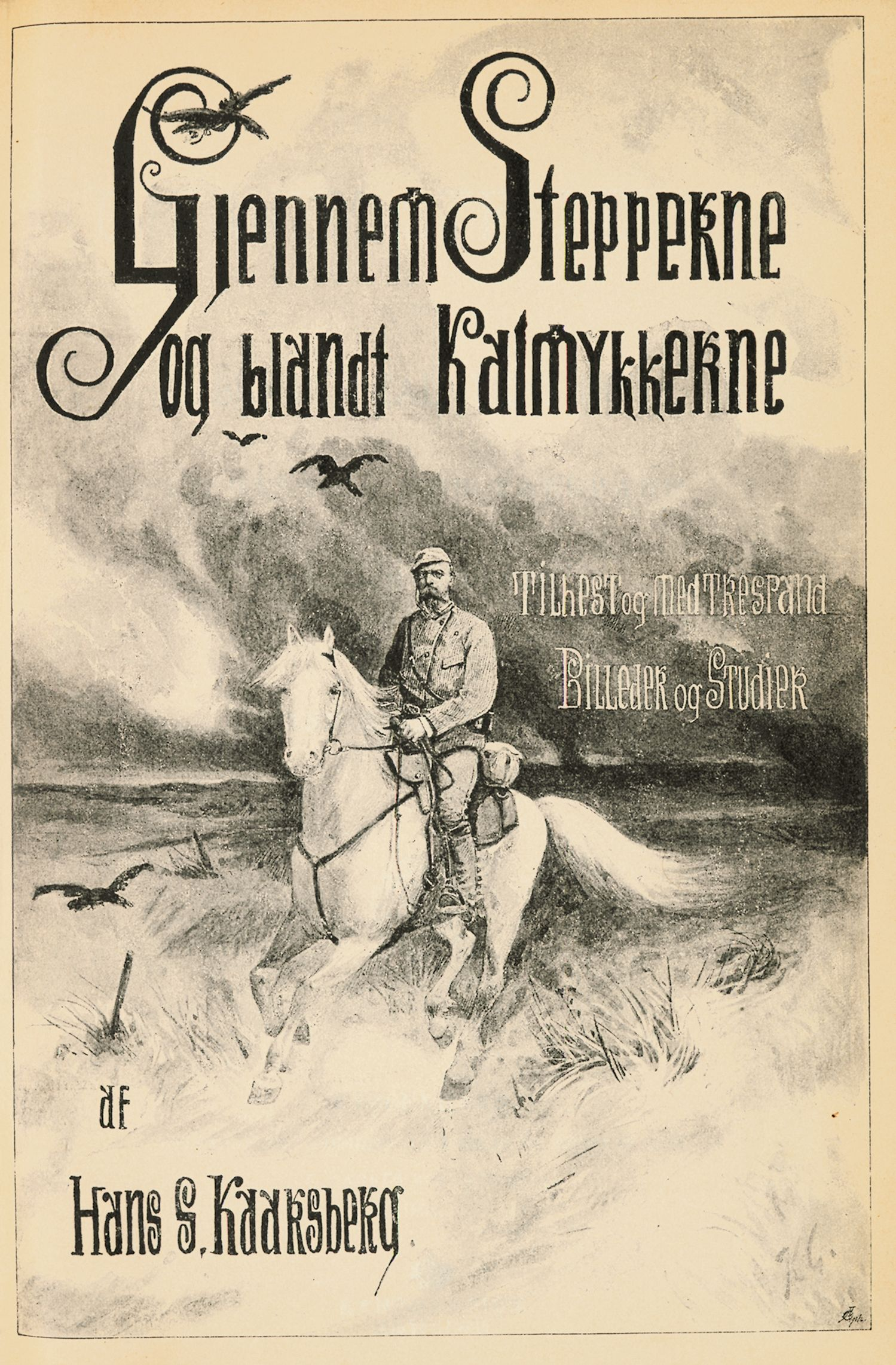
Gjennem Stepperne og blandt Kalmykkerne til Hest og med Trespand (1892).

Im 1886, Kaarsberg had his literary debut under the pseudonym Hans Juul with Mislyd og Harmonier. It was follow by a number of other publications, both of travel accounts, fiction, essays and travel books, often inspired by his travels and fascination with nature, hunting and outdoor life.

Stort vildt (1911) has been described as his most notable literary work. In 1914, a selection of his writings was published as Jagt og Jaget (Hunting and Hunted). In 1921–22, he published his memoirs in two volumes (MemoirerI-II, 1821–22).

== Personal life ==
On 10 September 1880 in Skelby, Kaarsberg married to reich countess Anna Elise Margarethe von Platen zu Hallermund (1854-1942). She was the daughter of reich count Emil Rudolph Platen zu Hallermund (1822–77). They were later divorced. On 20 May 1891 im Glumsø, Kaarsberg married secondly to Agnes Sidonie Overbeck-Petersen (1864-1944) She was the daughter of estate manager Heinrich Christopher Gottfried Petersen (1824–98) and Catharine Frederikke Elisabeth Benedicte Caroline Overbeck (1837–96). Kaarsberg was one of the first motorcyclists in Denmark. He died on 16 March 1929 and is buried at Sorø Cemetery.

== Legacy ==
A collection of artifacts and photographs from Kaarsberg's journey to Kalmykia is now in the collextion of the National Museum of Denmark. The street Dr. Kaarsbergs Vej in Sorø is named after him. A department of the local Sorø Hospital is also named Kaarsberg Centret after him. It contains an auditorium called the Kaarsberg Hall (Kaarsbergsalen). A portrait painting of Kaarsberg hangs on the wall.

Kaarsberg' writings were completely forgotten after his death. Among the Kalmyks of the Steppes on Horseback and by Troika: A Journey Made in 1890, an English-language translation of Gjennem Stepperne og blandt Kalmykkerne til Hest og med Trespand (Gyldendal, was published by the Mongolian Society in 1996.

In 2021, prompted by Kaarsberg Mysteriet, a five-episode DR podcast created by Klaus Rothstein, Kaarsberg attracted renewed interest for having inspired a young Karen Blixen's interest in travels, hunting and writing. In 1905, after Blixen had read aloud to her brother Thomas from one of Kaarsberg's short stories, on a large stone in Folehave Forest, they promised each other always to pursue the large things in life.

Ida Jessen modelled the protagonist of her 1997 novel Doktor Bagges anagrammer (Dr. Bagge's Anagrams) on Kaarsberg.

== List of works ==
- Mislyd og Harmonier (1886)
- Daarlige Tider (1887)
- Fordærvede (1888)
- Vore Børn og Vore Klæder (1889)
- Mutterlillen (1889)
- Mennesker. Fortællinger fra Kavkasus og Danmark (1892)
- Gjennem Stepperne og blandt Kalmykkerne til Hest og med Trespand (1892)
- Folkene paa Nakkebjerg (1895)
- Nordens sidste Nomade. Studier og Billeder fra svensk Lapmark nord for Polarkresen (1897)
- Langt ude - ( 1897)
- Sort og Rødt (1898)
- ''Trange Stier (1899)
- , Stort Vildt (1901)
- For en Vinteraften (1904)
- Æventyr-Digtet om Prins Hafiz' Rejse (1907)
- og Vildt – og tæmmet (1915)
- Jagt og jaget (1915)
- Feminismens Agitation i Danmark (1922)

== See also ==
- Henning Haslund-Christensen
