= Beatrice Blackwood =

British anthropologist

- Born: 3 May 1889; London, England
- Died: 29 November 1975 (aged 86)
- Known for: Anthropology

Beatrice Mary Blackwood (3 May 1889 – 29 November 1975) was a British anthropologist, who ran the Pitt Rivers Museum in Oxford from 1938 until her retirement in 1959.

== Early life and education ==
Beatrice Blackwood was born in London on 3 May 1889, daughter of the publisher James Blackwood. She studied in Germany and there learnt German, Latin and Greek. Blackwood completed a degree in English Literature and Language at Somerville College, Oxford in 1908–1912. After returning to Oxford to study for the diploma in anthropology in 1916, she gained a distinction and began a career working in the Human Anatomy Department at Oxford. Beginning working as a research assistant to Arthur Thomson in 1918, Blackwood then began teaching physical anthropology and working with anatomy collections as a Departmental Demonstrator. Women were not allowed to official matriculate or graduate from Oxford until 1920, at which time Ms. Blackwood took both the BA and MA in the same day. In 1923, she also earned a B.Sc. in Embryology. In 1924, Blackwood travelled to North America on a Laura Spelman Rockefeller Fellowship to study anthropology in Native American, African-American, Asian and Caucasian societies. During this time, Blackwood collected items to add to the Pitt Rivers Museum collection and contributed to a survey conducted by the National Research Council.

== Career ==
Blackwood was promoted to a University Demonstrator and Lecturer in Ethnology at Oxford upon her return in 1928. A year later, she received funding from Yale University, the Oxford Committee for Anthropology and the National Research Council and traveled to New Guinea for 18 months, where she worked in the Northern Solomon Islands. This research was eventually published by Oxford University Press in an ethnography entitled Both Sides of Buka Passage, in 1935. In 1936, Blackwood became the University Demonstrator in Ethnology at the Pitt Rivers Museum, and at that same time, she conducted her second field study abroad, this time in unadministered regions of Papua New Guinea. While travelling, she gathered over 2,000 materials to add to the collections at the Pitt Rivers Museum.

Upon returning to Oxford in 1938, Blackwood was appointed with Tom Penniman to lead the Pitt Rivers Museum. They created a system to help volunteers organize accession records of the museum and catalogue the museum's collections. In 1946, Blackwood was designated as a lecturer in ethnology at Oxford and continued to teach archaeology and anthropology to Oxford students seeking a Diploma in Anthropology.

== Later life ==
Blackwood retired from the Pitt Rivers Museum in 1959. Even after her retirement however, she continued to work on a catalogue of the museum's holdings. In 1970, she published The Classification of Artefacts in the Pitt Rivers Museum upon request of researchers from the Smithsonian who visited the museum. Blackwood was still found working at the museum long after her official retirement, up until a few days before her death in 1975.

== Awards and honours ==
- Elected a Fellow of the Royal Anthropological Institute (FRAI) in 1921
- Elected a Fellow of the Society of Antiquaries of London (FSA) in 1943
- Awarded the Rivers Memorial Medal by the Royal Anthropological Institute in 1943

== Selected publications ==
- A Study of Mental Testing in Relation to Anthropology. Mental Measurement Monographs 4. Baltimore, Maryland: Williams & Wilkins, 1927. OCLC 3765510.
- Both Sides of Buka Passage: An Ethnographic Study of Social, Sexual and Economic Questions in the North-Western Solomon Islands. Oxford: Clarendon-Oxford University, 1935. OCLC 1940625.
- The Technology of a Modern Stone Age People in New Guinea. Pitt Rivers Museum. Occasional Papers on Technology. Oxford: Oxford University, 1950. OCLC 1748061.
- The Classification of Artefacts in the Pitt Rivers Museum Oxford. Pitt Rivers Museum. Occasional Papers on Technology 11. Oxford: Oxford University, 1970. ISBN 9780902793002. Rev. ed. Schuyler Jones. The Origin and Development of the Pitt Rivers Museum. 1991. OCLC 41992399.
- The Kukukuku of the Upper Watut. Ed. from published articles and unpublished field-notes by C. R. Hallpike. Pitt Rivers Museum. Monograph Series 2. Oxford: Oxford University, 1978. OCLC 466759167.
