= Primitive Culture =

Primitive Culture may refer to:

- Urgesellschaft, a term for human culture prior to recorded history
- Primitive Culture (book), by Edward Burnett Tylor
