= Museum Ethnographers Group =

Collective of ethnographic researchers in the UK

The Museum Ethnographers Group (MEG) is a United Kingdom-based collective for those working with and researching ethnographic collections in museums. It is registered as a charity in England and Wales (no. 1023150) and is recognised in the UK museum sector as a subject specialist network. It is often known to its members by its acronym MEG. Its most obvious functions are the annual conference it organises and the journal it publishes.

== History ==
MEG was founded in 1975 at a meeting in Liverpool on Communicating Anthropology – the role of museums, when its first chair was Peter Gathercole.

== MEG conference ==
MEG holds an annual conference, normally hosted by a UK museum. MEG's 2018 conference at the Pitt Rivers Museum concerned the legacy of colonialism in British museums.

== Journal of Museum Ethnography ==
The MEG newsletter for many years functioned as a kind of journal, containing scholarly articles despite its photocopied pages. In 1989, MEG began to publish the Journal of Museum Ethnography (JME), and has done so every year since. In 2010, MEG reached an agreement with JSTOR to digitise all past issues of JME, as well as the early newsletters.

Issues and themes

| Volume | Year | Theme |
|---|---|---|
| 1 | 1989 | A Question of Image |
| 2 | 1990 | The Walrus Said |
| 3 | 1991 | African Anthropology in Scotland |
| 4 | 1992 | Baskets of the World |
| 5 | 1993 | What is Ethnography? |
| 6 | 1994 | Museum Ethnography and Communities |
| 7 | 1995 | Tourism, Anthropology and Museums & New Developments in Scotland |
| 8 | 1996 | Picturing Paradise |
| 9 | 1997 | MEG 21st Birthday: Past and future in museum ethnography |
| 10 | 1998 | Inter-Active: World Cultures and Museum Education |
| 11 | 1999 | 'Arts Premiers'? Ethnography and Art in the late 20th Century |
| 12 | 2000 | Glimpses of Africa – Museums, scholarship and popular culture |
| 13 | 2001 | Developing Dialogues: Museums and their Communities |
| 14 | 2002 | Transformations |
| 15 | 2003 | Power and Collecting |
| 16 | 2004 | Developing Audiences – Developing Collections |
| 17 | 2005 | Pacific Ethnography, Politics and Museums |
| 18 | 2006 | Looking Backward, Looking Forward |
| 19 | 2007 | Feeling the Vibes: Dealing with Intangible Heritage |
| 20 | 2008 | Objects of Trade |
| 21 | 2009 | Encounters with Polynesia: Exhibiting the Past in the Present |
| 22 | 2010 | Museum Ethnography at Home |
