= Barbara Freire-Marreco =

English anthropologist and folklorist

Barbara Whitchurch Freire-Marreco (11 December 1879 – 1967) was an English anthropologist and folklorist. She was a member of the first class of anthropology students to graduate from Oxford in 1908. She is notable for her focus on ethical responsibility in anthropology, linguistic skills and fieldwork with the Yavapai and Pueblo peoples.

== Early life ==
She was born in London but spent her childhood in Horsell, Woking, Surrey. Her father was an accountant whose own father was originally from Portugal. Her middle name Whitchurch was in honour of a relative in her mothers family. She had a brother named Geoffrey. She was a pupil at Guildford High School and the family attended a local Anglican church. She learned to fluently speak German, French and Spanish and developed some fluency in Russian and Asian languages.

== Career ==
Her career was inspired by lectures given by the archaeologists John Linton Myres and Henry Balfour. She learned enough Greek in six weeks to pass the Oxford University admissions exams and enrol in a Classics education at Lady Margaret Hall College. She remained a student of Balfour, and her education spanned a fellowship at Oxford and as a student of Professor Hobhouse at the London School of Economics. Her papers were published in Man and read before the British Association.

She took a position at the Pitt Rivers Museum to study for her diploma in anthropology and was one of the first two students to undertake the qualification, achieving a Distinction. She remained associated with this institution when this was completed and a collection of 300 of her specimens is still held at the museum. She became a fellow of the Royal Anthropological Institute in 1907 and contributed to the Institutes' publication Notes and Queries on Anthropology in 1912.

From 1909 to 1913 she held a research fellowship at Somerville College, Oxford where she lectured and researched 'the nature of authority of chiefs and kings in uncivilized society'. Her membership in the Folklore Society from 1926 was preceded by articles in its journal, for which she continued to contribute 'Scraps of English folklore', correspondence, and a study of "processes of localization and relocalization" of folklore.

The results of her meticulously documented ethnographic fieldwork on the Pueblo peoples were published in the Smithsonian's Ethnobotany of the Tewa Indians. The work was undertaken in 1910, whilst she lived in pueblo settlements of New Mexico, and in 1913, whilst researching the Yavapai peoples in Arizona. Images from these research trips were included in an exhibition 'Intrepid Women: Fieldwork in Action, 1910–1957' at the Pitt Rivers Museum from 5 October 2018 to 11 March 2019.

Whilst living and working on the reservations she learned the Tewa language and became fluent enough to support the New Mexico pueblos to apply to the United States Government for assistance in enforcing their laws and governmental structures. She also became fluent in the Yavapai language and supported taking legal proceedings over water rights. She was committed to what she felt was the ethical responsibility of anthropologists.

== Later life ==
Barbara married Robert Aitken during World War I, meeting while they were employed at the War Trade Intelligence Department. They eventually moved to the county of Hampshire. She retired from her academic career in 1916, after her marriage.

== Publications ==
- “Notes on the Hair and Eye Colour of 591 Children of School Age in Surrey” Man, Vol. 9, 1909, pp. 99–108
- “The West Riding Teachers’ Anthropological Society” Folklore, Vol. 21, No. 1, 1910, pp. 103–04
- "Crosses Cut in Turf after Fatal Accidents” Folklore, Vol. 21, No. 3, 1910, pp. 387–88
- “Tewa Kinship Terms from the Pueblo of Hano, Arizona” American Anthropologist, Vol. 16, No. 2, 1914, pp. 269–87
- “A Note on Kinship Terms Compounded with the Postfix ’E in the Hano Dialect of Tewa” American Anthropologist, Vol. 17, No. 1, 1915, pp. 198–202
- with Aurelio M Espinosa: “New-Mexican Spanish Folk-Lore” The Journal of American Folklore, Vol. 29, No. 114, 1916, pp. 505–46

== Sources ==
- A Life Well Led: The Biography of Barbara Freire-Marreco Aitken, British Anthropologist (2008) by Mary Ellen Blair ISBN 9780865344969
