= Henry Balfour =

British archaeologist (1863–1939)

Henry Balfour FRS FRAI
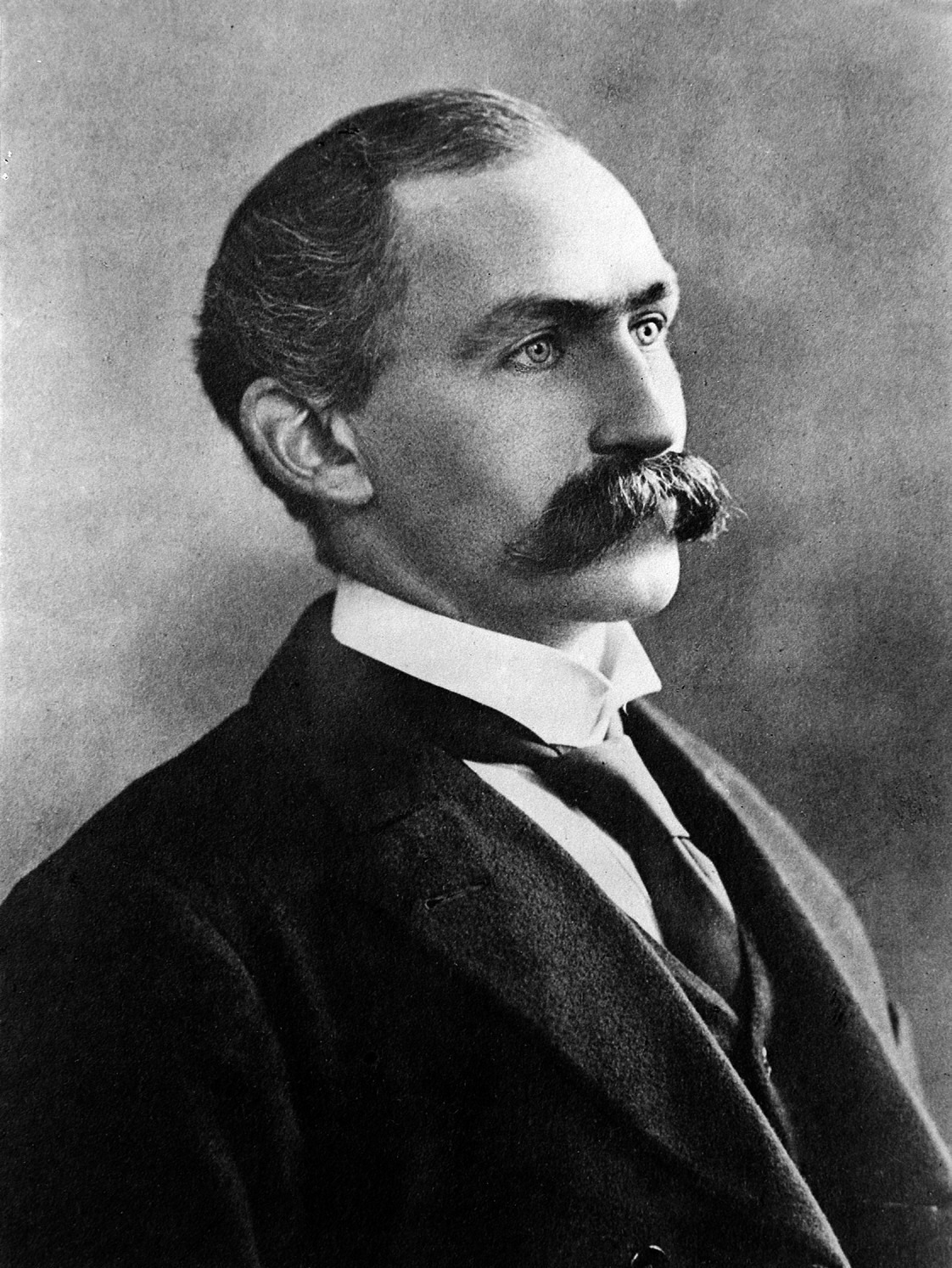
- Portrait of Balfour published in Popular Science Monthly, 1904
- Born: 11 April 1863
- Died: 9 February 1939 (aged 75)
- Education: Trinity College, Oxford
- Scientific career
- Workplaces: Pitt Rivers Museum

Henry Balfour FRS FRAI (11 April 1863 – 9 February 1939) was a British archaeologist, and the first curator of the Pitt Rivers Museum.

He was president of the Royal Anthropological Institute, Museums Association, Folklore Society, Royal Geographical Society, and a Fellow of the Royal Society.

== Biography ==
Henry Balfour was born in 1863 in Croydon, London, United Kingdom. He was the only son of Lewis Balfour (1833–1885), a silk broker from Croydon, and Sarah Walker Comber (1836–1916). He had two older sisters: Edith Balfour (born c. 1859) and Marian Balfour (born c. 1860).

Balfour was educated at Charterhouse and Trinity College, Oxford (matriculated 1881–graduated 1885), and took Honours Mods and later the final school of animal morphology in 1885. In 1884, the University of Oxford accepted the collection of ethnological and archaeological specimens made and arranged by General Augustus Pitt Rivers. Professor H. N. Moseley, in whose charge the creation of the Pitt Rivers Museum was placed, invited Balfour, who was one of his students, to assist in the installation of the collection in the new museum building. Moseley had recognized the keen and alert intelligence of Balfour, his love of animals, and his skill as a draughtsman.

Balfour continued to work under Moseley's supervision until Moseley's death in 1891 when the responsibility for the museum was transferred to Balfour. Balfour was appointed Curator in 1893 and continued in that position until his death. Balfour's work and his collecting grew the museum past the original nucleus of the Pitt Rivers collection. He developed a circle of colleagues from institutions around the world and drew on those relationships to encourage new acquisitions. He travelled extensively and donated a large number of accquisitions to the museum. He also gave lectures to Oxford University students who went on to excellent careers as anthropologists and colonial administrators and who also donated to the museum.

Balfour stated in his Presidential Address to the Somersetshire Archaeological and Natural History Society in 1919:

Arguing from the known to the unknown, these modern survivals of early cultures have been used, as far as possible, to complete the picture of the life and industries of Prehistoric Man. From the combined material derived from ancient and modern times series were created to show, tentatively at any rate, how the more developed types of appliances were arrived at by successive slight improvements from their simple and generalized prototypes. Incidentally these typological series serve to demonstrate the geographical distribution of particular arts, industries, and appliances, a matter which is becoming recognized as increasingly important, as affording valuable clues to the intricate problems of racial dispersal and migration routes, and as supplying evidence of the culture-contact between various peoples not necessarily related to one another.

Balfour went on to say, "In studying the development of human arts, it must not be supposed that progress was effected by a simple process of what is known as 'end-on' evolution, the successive morphological changes following one another in simple unilinear series."

In 1887 Henry married Edith Marie Louise Wilkins, the only daughter of Robert Francis Wilkins of Kingswear, South Devon. They had one son, Lewis Balfour (1887–1974). The Balfours lived at 11 Norham Gardens, Oxford before moving to Langley Lodge, Headington, Oxford later in life. A few months after the death of his wife, Balfour died at his home in Headington, Oxford, on 9 February 1939.

== Works ==
Although he only wrote one book, The Evolution of Decorative Art (1893), Balfour published numerous scholarly articles, often taking a specific type of object – from musical bows to fire-pistons or fishing-kites – and exploring its "evolutionary development" through history and across different cultures.

- 1888 – "Evolution of a Characteristic Pattern on the Shafts of Arrows from the Solomon Islands". Journal of the Anthropological Institute, May 1888, pp. 328–31.
- 1889 – "Note on the use of elk teeth for money in North America". Journal of the Anthropological Institute, August 1888, p. 54.
- 1889 – "The Fin Whale Fishery in North Lapland". Henry Balfour. The Midland Naturalist, Vol. XII, 1889, pp. 1–14.
- 1890 – "The Old British 'Pibcorn' or 'Hornpipe,' and its Affinities". Journal of the Anthropological Institute, November 1890, pp. 142–54.
- 1892 – "Stone implements from the Malay Peninsula in the Pitt-Rivers Museum". Archaeologia Oxoniensis, December 1892, pp. 1–6.
- 1895 – "Ancient Double Hooks of Bronze". Reliquary and Illustrated Archaeologist, 1895, pp. 1–3.
- 1897 – "Life History of an Aghori Fakir". Journal of the Anthropological Institute, May 1897, pp. 340–57.
- 1898 – "Notes on the arrangement of the Pitt-Rivers Museum", pp. 1–4.
- 1898 – "Notes on the Modern Use of Bone Skates". Reliquary and Illustrated Archaeologist, January 1898, pp. 1–9.
- 1898 – "Sledges with Bone Runners in modern use". Reliquary and Illustrated Archaeologist, October 1898, pp. 1–13.
- 1899 – "The Natural History of the Musical Bow". The Clarendon Press (Oxford University Press), 1899
- 1901 – "Guilloche Pattern on an Etruscan Potsherd". MAN: A Monthly Record of Anthropological Science No. 4, p. 8.
- 1901 – "Native Smoking Pipes from Natal". Collected by H. D. R. Kingston and described by Henry Balfour. MAN: A Monthly Record of Anthropological Science, No. 10, pp. 11–12.
- 1901 – "A Swan-neck Boomerang of unusual form". MAN: A Monthly Record of Anthropological Science, March 1901, p. 33.
- 1901 – "Three Bambu Trumpets from Northern Territory, South Australia". MAN: A Monthly Record of Anthropological Science, No. 28, p. 33.
- 1901 – "Memorial Heads in the Pitt-Rivers Museum". MAN: A Monthly Record of Anthropological Science, May 1901, pp. 65–6.
- 1901 – "A Spear-head and Socketed Celt of Bronze from the Shan States, Burma". MAN: A Monthly Record of Anthropological Science, July 1901, pp. 97–8.
- 1902 – "The Goura a stringed-wind musical instrument of the Bushmen and Hottentotts". Journal of the Anthropological Institute, January–June 1902, Vol. XXXII, pp. 156–75.
- 1903 – "On the Method employed the Natives of N.W. Australia in the Manufacture of Glass Spear-heads". MAN: A Monthly Record of Anthropological Science, May 1903, p. 65.
- 1903 – "Thunderbolt Celts from Benin". MAN: A Monthly Record of Anthropological Science, No. 102, pp. 182–3.
- 1903 – Review of Mead "The Musical Instruments of the Incas", Henry Balfour. MAN: A Monthly Record of Anthropological Science, No. 112.
- 1904 – "Presidential Address". Journal of the Anthropological Institute, January–June 1904, Vol. XXXIV, pp. 10–19.
- 1904 – "Musical Instruments from the Malay Peninsula", in Fasciculi Malayenses, Anthropology, Part II, edited by Nelson Annandale, pp. 1–18.
- 1904 – "Presidential Address to the Anthropological Section B.A.A.S. (British Association for the Advancement of Science).", Cambridge 1904, pp. 1–12.
- 1905 – "Presidential Address". Journal of the Anthropological Institute, January–June 1905, Vol. XXXIV, pp. 12–19.
- 1905 – "A Double-headed Club from the Fijian Islands". MAN: A Monthly Record of Anthropological Science February 1905, p. 17.
- 1905 – "Bird and Human Designs from the Solomon Islands, illustrating the influence of one design over another". MAN: A Monthly Record of Anthropological Science June 1905, pp. 81–3.
- 1905 – "Musical Instruments of South Africa", B.A.A.S. (British Association for the Advancement of Science) Report 1905. pp. 1–2 (Section H – South Africa, 1905).
- 1906 – "Note upon an implement of Palaeolithic type from the Victoria Falls, Zambesi". Journal of the Anthropological Institute, January–June 1906, Vol. XXXVI, pp. 170–1.
- 1906 – Flint-engraved pottery from the ruins at Khami and Dhlo Dhlo, Rhodesia. MAN: A Monthly Record of Anthropological Science 1906 – No. 11, pp. 1–3.
- 1907 – "Haida Portrait Mask". MAN: A Monthly Record of Anthropological Science January 1907, p. 1.
- 1907 – "The Friction-Drum". Journal of the Royal Anthropological Institute (JRAI), January–June 1907, Vol. XXXVII, pp. 67–92.
- 1909 – "The Origin of West African Crossbows", Henry Balfour. Journal of the African Society, Vol. VIII, No. XXXII, July 1909, pp. 338–56.
- 1909 – "Presidential Address, Museums Association" . Museums Journal, July 1909, pp. 5–18.
- 1909 – "The Indian Collection at South Kensington", letter Henry Balfour. The Times 23 February 1909.
- 1910 – "Archaeological and Ethnological Research in South Africa". The Times, 5 November 1910, pp. 1–16.
- 1912 – "Notes on a Collection of Ancient Stone Implements from Ejura, Ashanti". Journal of the African Society, Vol. XII, No. XLV, October 1912, pp. 1–16.
- 1912 – "The Wart-Hog", letter from Henry Balfour. Country Life, 9 November 1912, p. 656.
- 1913 – "Kite Fishing", in Essays presented to William Ridgeway on his Sixtieth Birthday, 6 August 1913, edited by E. C. Quiggin, published by the Cambridge University Press, pp. 583–608.
- 1914 – "Frictional Fire-Making with Flexible Sawing-Thong". Journal of the Royal Anthropological Institute, January–June 1914, Vol. XLIV, pp. 32–64.
- 1915 – "Note on a new kind of fish-hook from Goodenough Island. D'Entrecasteaux Group, New Guinea". MAN: A Monthly Record of Anthropological Science February 1915 – No. 9, p. 1.
- 1916 – "Origin and Relationship of Hani, Tewha-Tewha and Pou-Whenua". MAN: A Monthly Record of Anthropological Science, No. 108, p. 181.
- 1917 – "Ceremonial Paddle of the Kalabari of Southern Nigeria". MAN: A Monthly Record of Anthropological Science April 1917 – No. 44, pp. 1–2.
- 1917 – "Ceremonial Paddle of the Kalabari of Southern Nigeria". MAN: A Monthly Record of Anthropological Science April 1917, No. 44, pp. 57–8.
- 1917 – "Some types of native hoes, Naga Hills". MAN: A Monthly Record of Anthropological Science July 1917 – No. 74, pp. 1–3.
- 1917 – "Willow Wand Whistles", letter from Henry Balfour. Times Literary Supplement, 29 March 1917.
- 1917 – "Ethnological Suggestions in regard to Easter Island or Rapanui" Folk-Lore, December 1917, pp. 355–381.
- 1918 – "Some specimens from the Chatham Islands". MAN: A Monthly Record of Anthropological Science October 1918 – No. 80, pp. 1–4.
- 1919 – "An Eskimo Week-Calendar". MAN: A Monthly Record of Anthropological Science June 1919 – No. 47, pp. 1–2.
- 1919 – "Presidential Address" . Proceedings of the Somersetshire Archaeological and Natural History Society, Vol. LXV (1919), pp. xxiii–xxxiii.
- —. 1920 – "The Rushbrook Painted Coat", letter from Henry Balfour. Country Life, 31 January 1920.
- —. 1921 – Foreword to The Sema Naga 1921 by J. H. Hutton.
- —. 1921 – "The Statues of Easter Island". Folklore, Vol. XXXII, No. 1, 31 March 1921, pp. 70–2.
- —. 1921 – "Varieties of the Common Gannet". British Birds Vol. XV, No. 4, 1 September 1921.
- —. 1921 – "The Archer's Bow in the Homeric Poems". Huxley Memorial Lecture 1921, pp. 1–20.
- —. 1922 – "Earth Smoking-Pipes from South Africa & Central Asia". RMAN: A Monthly Record of Anthropological Science May 1922 – No. 45, pp. 1–5.
- —. 1922 – "Hose, Charles (1863–1929)", in Dictionary of National Biography, 1922–30, pp. 948–950.
- —. 1923 – "Musical Instruments in the Charterhouse Museum". Greyfriar, Vol. VIII, No. 111, 1923.
- —. 1923 – "The Welfare of Primitive Peoples – Presidential Address", Folk-Lore, March, 1923, pp. 12–24.
- —. 1924 – "The Geographical Study of Folklore – Presidential Address", Folk-Lore, March, 1924, pp. 16–25.
- —. 1925 – "The Status of the Tasmanians among the Stone Age Peoples". Prehistoric Society of East Anglia, Vol. V, Part I, 1925, pp. 1–15.
- —. 1926 – Foreword to The Ao Naga by J. P. Mills
- —. 1926 – "Ceremonial Fire-making in the Naga Hills. Reprinted from MAN: A Monthly Record of Anthropological Science June 1926, pp. 1–3.
- —. 1926 – "Risso's Grampus off the Pembrokeshire Coast". The Field, 5 August 1926
- —. 1927 – "Coup-de-Poing". Nature 119 1927 (pp. 490–1). Two letters one W. J. Sollas (University College, Oxford) and the other a reply Henry Balfour.
- —. 1927 – "Fishing in Homer", two letters from Henry Balfour. The Times Literary Supplement 2 June 1927 and 30 June 1927
- —. 1929 – "Stone Implements of the Tasmanians and the Culture-Status which they Suggest". Report of the Hobart Meeting 1928 of the Australasian Association for the Advancement of Science, pp. 314–322.
- —. 1929 – "South Africa's contribution to prehistoric archaeology". Presidential Address to the Anthropology Section, British Association for the Advancement of Science (BAAS) report 1929, pp. 1–12.
- —. 1929 – "Concerning Thunderbolts". Folk-Lore Vol. XL, No. 1, 31 March 1929, pp. 37–49.
- —. 1929 – "Obituary – Sir Charles Hercules Read, July 6, 1857 – February 11, 1929". MAN: A Monthly Record of Anthropological Science, April 1929, No. 48, pp. 61–2.
- —. 1929 – Foreword to booklet on the Hausa people.
- —. 1932 – "An ingenious primitive". Letter to the editor from Henry Balfour. Country Life, 10 December 1932.
- —. 1932 – "Thorn-lined Traps in the Pitt-Rivers Museum, Oxford. MAN: A Monthly Record of Anthropological Science March 1932 – No. 77, pp. 1–3.
- —. 1932 – "Notes on the Composite Bow from Hunza". MAN: A Monthly Record of Anthropological Science, No. 196, p. 161.
- —. 1934 – "Occurrence of 'Cleavers' of Lower-Palaeolithic type in Northern Nigeria". MAN: A Monthly Record of Anthropological Science No. 25, pp. 21–24.
- —. 1934 – "The Tandu industry in Northern Nigeria and its affinities elsewhere". Essays Presented to C. G. Seligman, 1934, pp. 5–18.
- —. 1937 – "Address at the Annual General Meeting", of the Society held on 18 October 1937, the President (Henry Balfour). Geographical Journal, Vol. XC No. 6, December 1937, pp. 489–497.
- —. 1937 "Spinners and Weavers in Anthropological Research". Frazer Lecture, published by Oxford University Press (Clarendon Press) in 1938, pp. 1–19.
