= Schuyler Jones =

American-born anthropologist (1930–2024)

Schuyler Jones CBE (7 February 1930 – 17 May 2024) was an American-born anthropologist and museum curator based in the United Kingdom. He was best known for his ethnographic fieldwork in the Nuristan region of Afghanistan, as well as his role as Director of the Pitt Rivers Museum, University of Oxford, between 1985 and 1997. Jones was an Emeritus Fellow of Linacre College, Oxford.

== Early life and education ==
Jones was born in Wichita, Kansas, United States, the son of Schuyler and Ignace (Mead) Jones, and was educated at Wichita High School. After World War II Jones moved to Paris, worked as a photographer for a time and then went to Africa as a freelance photojournalist for four years. He later settled in Greece and supported himself in part by translating technical books from German and French to English for a publisher in Germany. In 1958, having undertaken an overland journey from Tangier to Cape Town, Jones decided to drive from Greece to India and Nepal. This journey, Jones later noted, 'led to a love affair with Afghanistan'.

He later went to the University of Edinburgh to study for an MA in Anthropology, graduating in 1965, before completing a DPhil at the University of Oxford in 1970 for a thesis titled Kalashum Political Organization: A Study of Village Government in Waigal Valley, Nuristan which was supervised by Edward Evan Evans-Pritchard.

== Career ==
After completing his doctoral studies, Jones was appointed Assistant Curator and University Lecturer in Ethnology at the Pitt Rivers Museum and Linacre College, Oxford, a post which he held from 1971 to 1985, when he was appointed Director of the Museum. Jones retired as Director in 1997, after which he returned to the USA. Jones has served on the board of governors of the Kansas State Historical Society since 2004. Jones was a member of Council of the Royal Anthropological Institute 1986 to 1989. Jones was a Trustee of the Horniman Museum, London, 1989—1995. Jones was appointed CBE in 1998 in the Queen's birthday honours following his retirement 'for services to the Pitt Rivers Museum'.

== Fieldwork ==
Jones undertook numerous fieldwork expeditions. During 1951–1952 he visited the Atlas Mountains of Morocco, Southern Algeria, and French West Africa. In 1952–1953 he visited the then Belgian Congo (now Democratic Republic of the Congo). In 1954 he again visited the Morocco High Atlas Mountains, as well as Algeria, the Sahara, and Niger River. In 1953 he spent time in East Africa, and in 1958-9 he visited Turkey, Iran, Afghanistan, Pakistan, India, and Nepal.

Jones was best known for his ten expeditions to Nuristan in the Hindu Kush region of Afghanistan between 1960 and 1970 which resulted in his best known published works.

Later expeditions included Chinese Turkestan (1985), Tibet and Gobi Desert (1986), Southern China, Xinjiang and Pakistan (1988), Western Greenland (1991), Greenland and East Africa (1993).

Jones was a proficient and prolific photographer, and his collection is archived at the Pitt Rivers Museum, University of Oxford. A collection of his professional papers is also archived at the Bodleian Library, University of Oxford.

Jones died on 17 May 2024, at the age of 94.

== Selected publications ==
Jones, Schuyler. Under the African Sun. London: Hurst and Blackett, 1956.

Jones, Schuyler. Men of Influence in Nuristan: A Study of Social Control and Dispute Settlement in Waigal Valley, Afghanistan. Vol. 3. Academic Press, 1974.

Edelberg, Lennart., and Schuyler Jones. Nuristan. Graz: Akadem. Druck- U. Verlagsanst, 1979. Print.

Jones, Schuyler. Tibetan nomads: environment, pastoral economy, and material culture. Thames and Hudson, 1996.

Jones, Schuyler. A Stranger Abroad: A Memoir (Introduction by Michael Palin). Wichita, Kansas: Rowfant Press, 2011
