= Pitt Rivers Museum =

Museum of archaeology and anthropology in Oxford, England

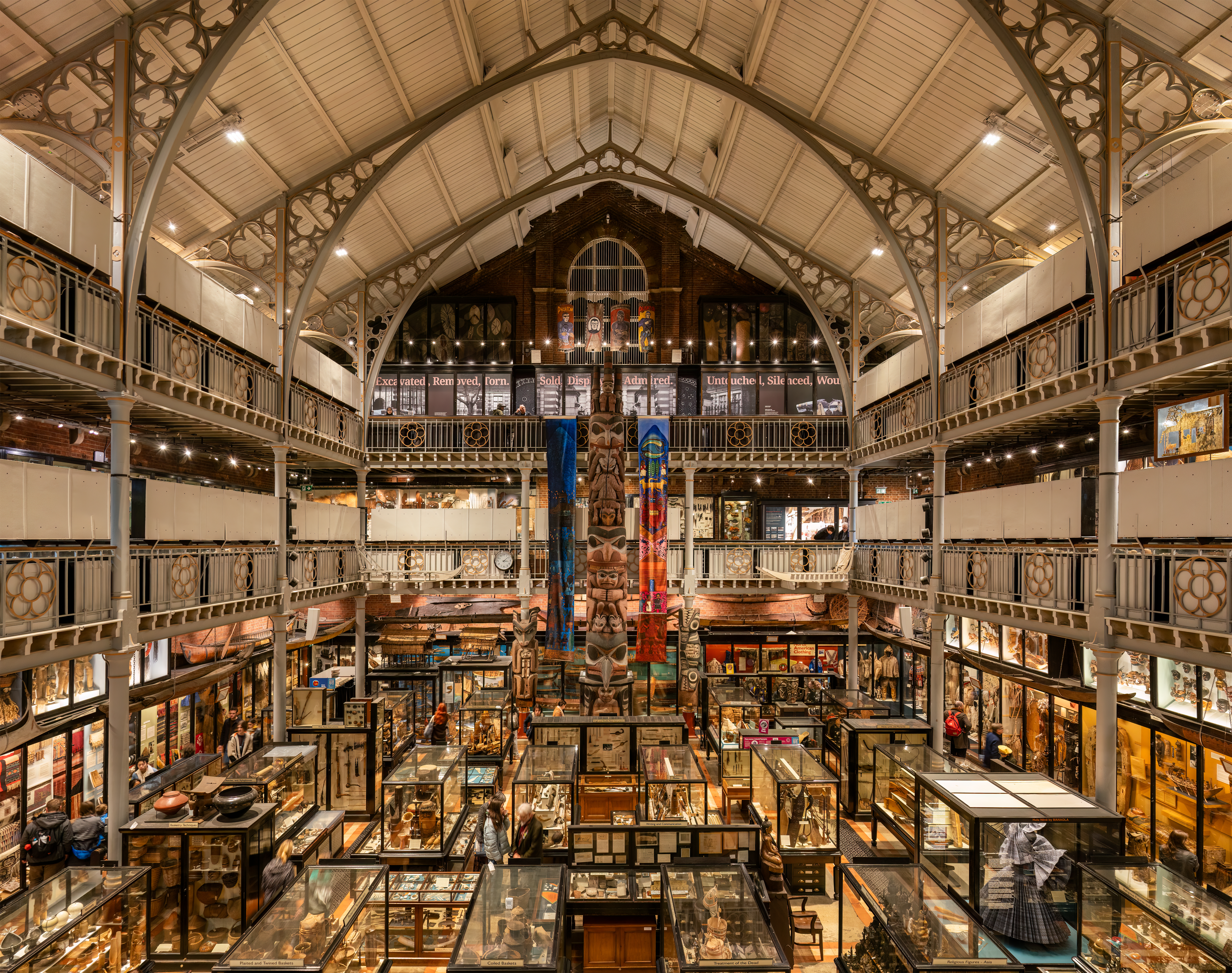
- Pitt Rivers Museum interior, 2025

- Pitt Rivers Museum
- Established: 1884
- Location: Parks Road, Oxford, England
- Coordinates: 51.7586°N 1.2550°W
- Type: University museum of archaeology and anthropology
- Visitors: 519,952 (2015)
- Website: prm.ox.ac.uk

Pitt Rivers Museum is a museum displaying the archaeological and anthropological collections of the University of Oxford in England. The museum is located to the east of the Oxford University Museum of Natural History, and can only be accessed through that building.

The museum was founded in 1884 by Augustus Pitt Rivers, who donated his private collection to the University of Oxford with the condition that a permanent lecturer in anthropology must be appointed. Edward Burnett Tylor thereby became the first lecturer in anthropology in the UK following his appointment to the post of Reader in Anthropology in 1885. Museum staff are still involved in teaching archaeology and anthropology at the university. The first curator of the museum was Henry Balfour. A second stipulation in the Deed of Gift was that a building should be provided to house the collection and used for no other purpose. The university therefore engaged Thomas Manly Deane, son of Thomas Newenham Deane who, together with Benjamin Woodward, had designed and built the original Oxford University Museum of Natural History building three decades earlier, to create an adjoining building at the rear of the museum of natural history to house the collection. Construction started in 1885 and was completed in 1886.

The original donation consisted of approximately 22,000 items; this has now grown to more than 600,000 items, including major photographic holdings, nearly all of which has been acquired via donation by colonial officials, travellers, scholars, and missionaries.

== Organization ==
The main exhibition space in the museum's building is a large, rectangular, colonnaded room. It has two mezzanine levels and a massive, vaulted ceiling, and is brimming with glass display cases and exhibits. The entrance to the museum is found at the back of the Oxford University Museum of Natural History.

The museum's collection is arranged typologically, according to how the objects were used, rather than according to their age or origin. The display of many examples of a particular type of tool or artefact, showing historical and regional variations, is an unusual and distinct feature of this museum. This typological layout is based upon Pitt Rivers' theories; he intended for his collection to show progression in design and evolution in human culture from the simple to the complex. Although this evolutionary approach to material culture is no longer appropriate in the modern display paradigm for archaeological and anthropological objects, the museum has broadly retained the original typological organization due to the Pitt Rivers Deed of Gift which stipulated that any changes to the displays "shall not affect the general principle originated by Augustus Henry Lane Fox Pitt Rivers".

As the museum has an extensive collection of objects, those on display are changed periodically.

The museum was closed from 17 March 2020 to 22 September 2020 due to the COVID-19 pandemic. During this closure, a decision was made to remove displays of shrunken heads as well as other human remains. The museum's director issued a statement, "Exhibiting Tsantsas (shrunken heads) reinforced racist and stereotypical thinking that goes against the museum’s core values.” The shrunken heads had been on display since the 1940s.

== Haida totem pole ==
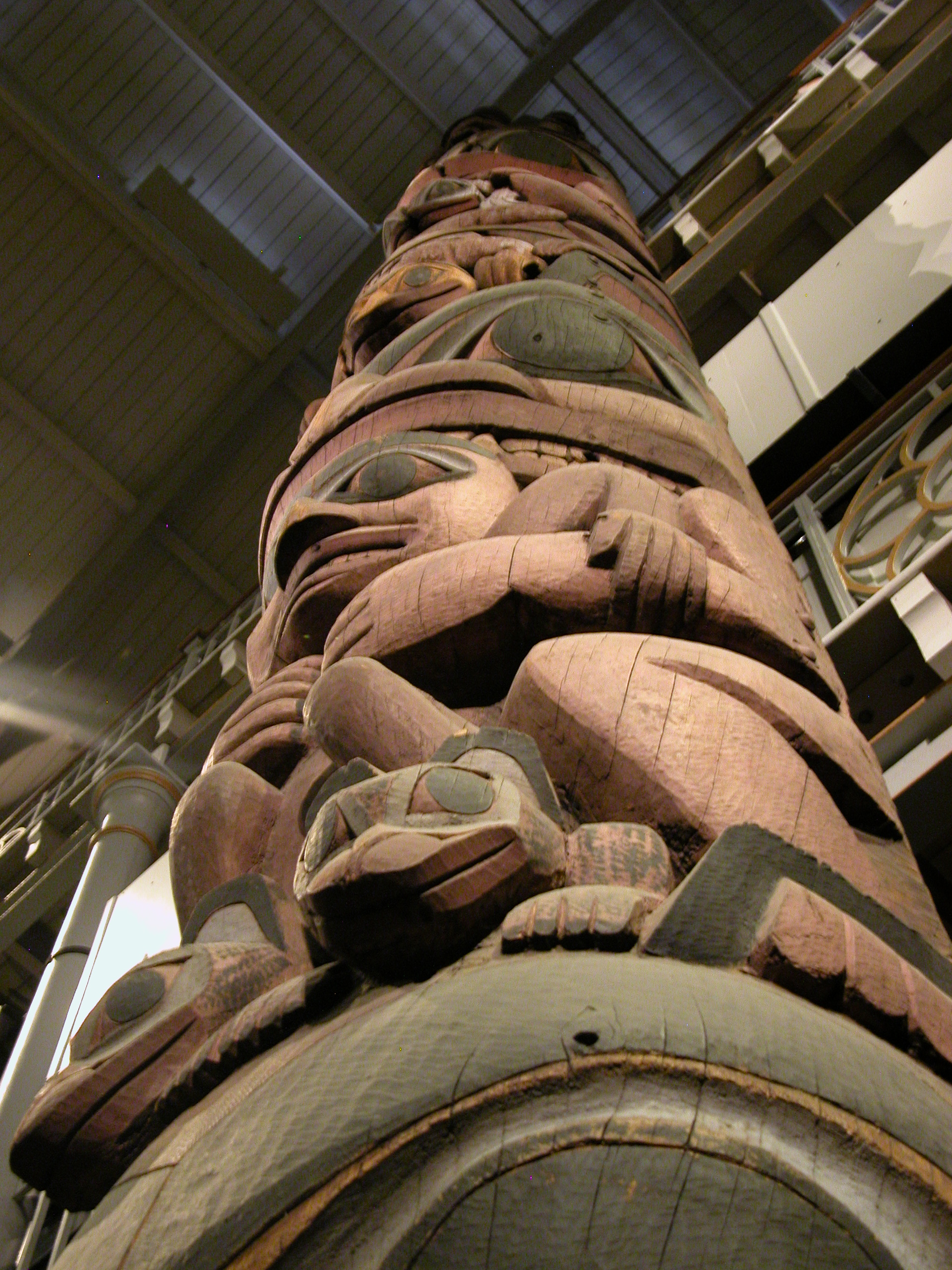
The Haida totem pole, from Star House in Massett village on Haida Gwaii (the Queen Charlotte Islands), Canada

The largest object on display in the museum is the Haida house post, a totem pole, which has a height of 11.36m. It originally stood in front of the Star House in the village of Old Massett (Haida name Uttewas), on Graham Island, in British Columbia, Canada. The Star House belonged to Chief Anetlas (c.1816–1893); it is thought that the house was constructed in 1882. The pole was purchased by Edward Burnett Tylor and transported to the Pitt Rivers Museum in 1901.

== Photo gallery ==
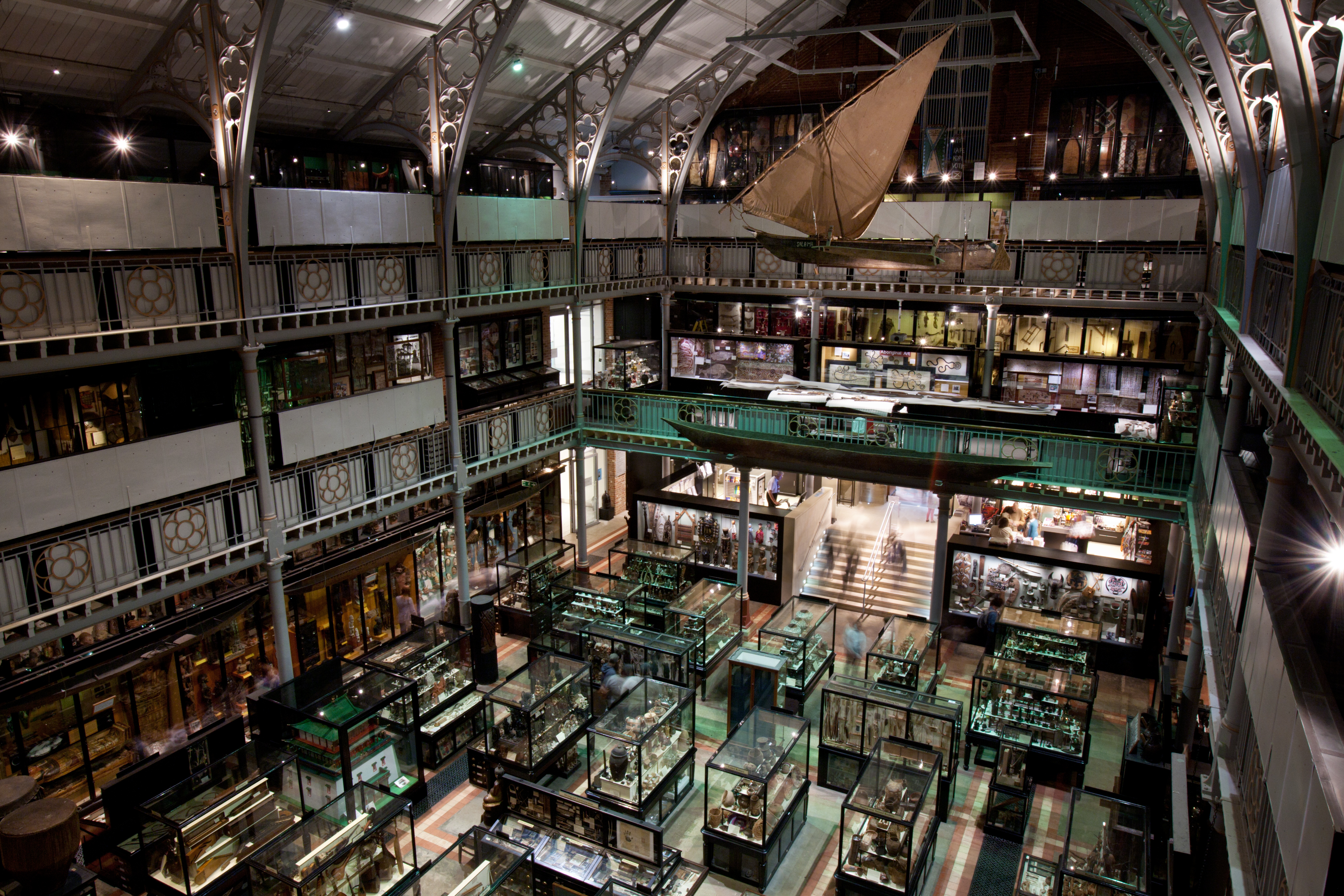
The Pitt Rivers Museum

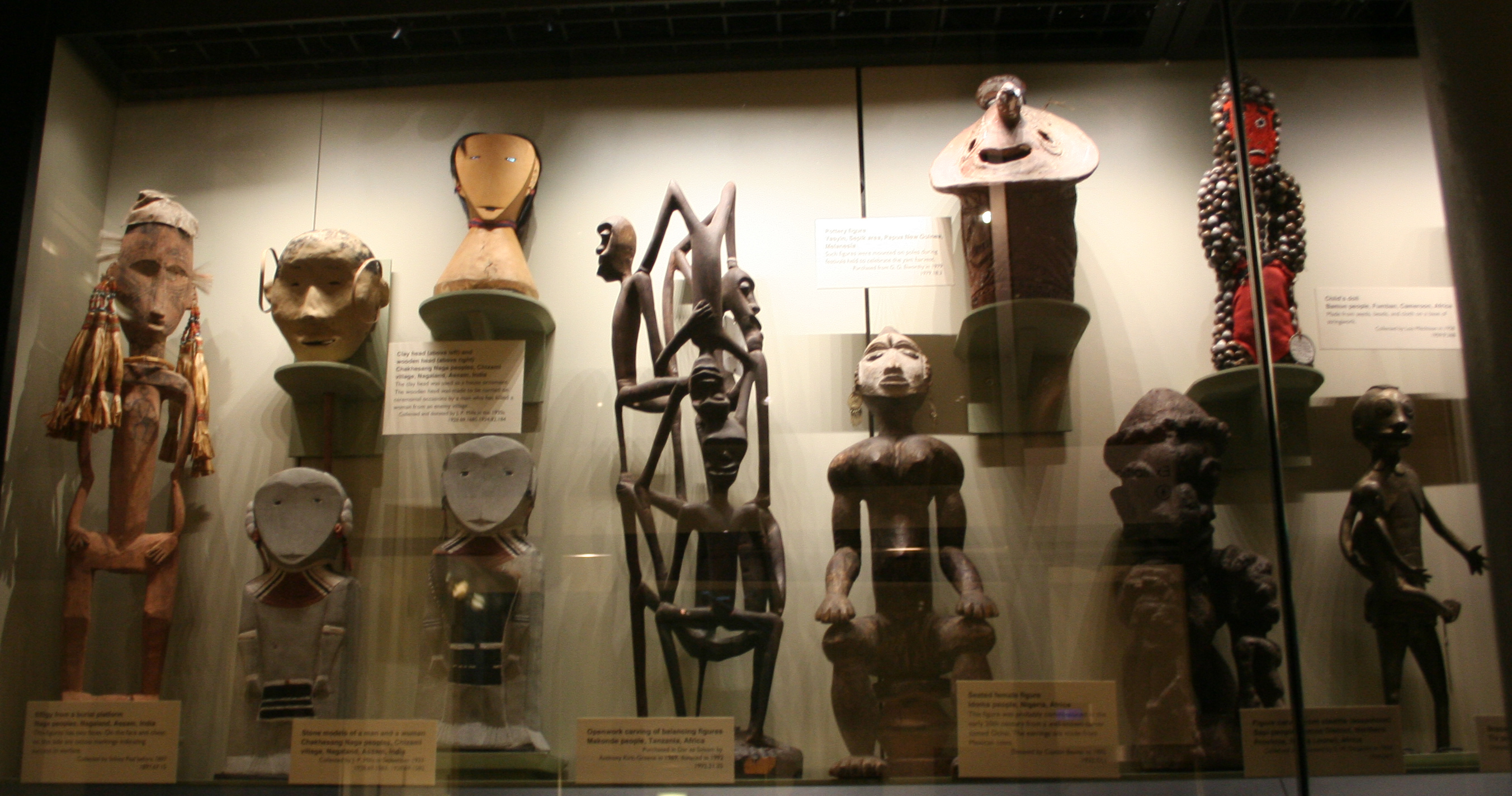
Figures from around the world

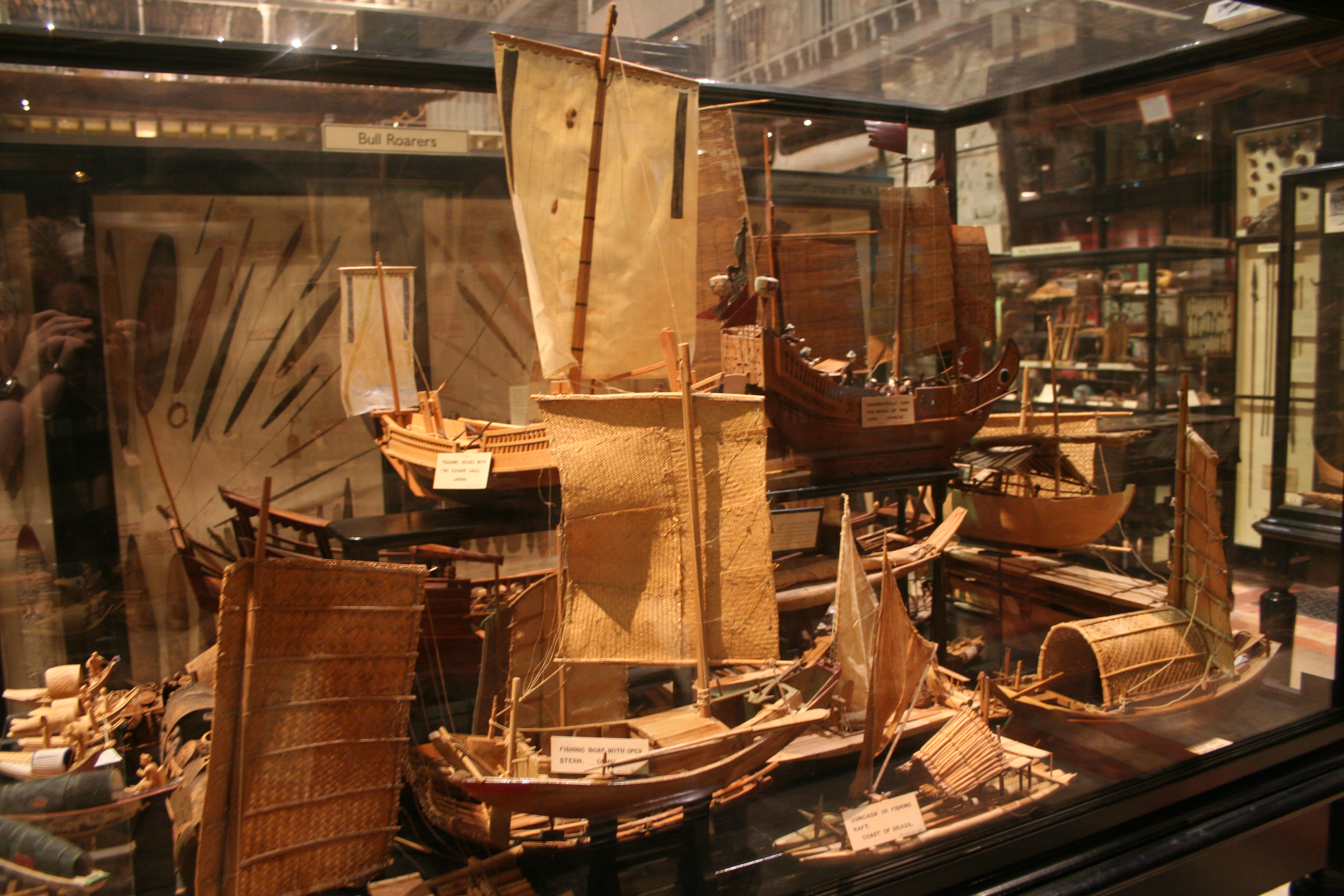
Fishing boat models from around the world

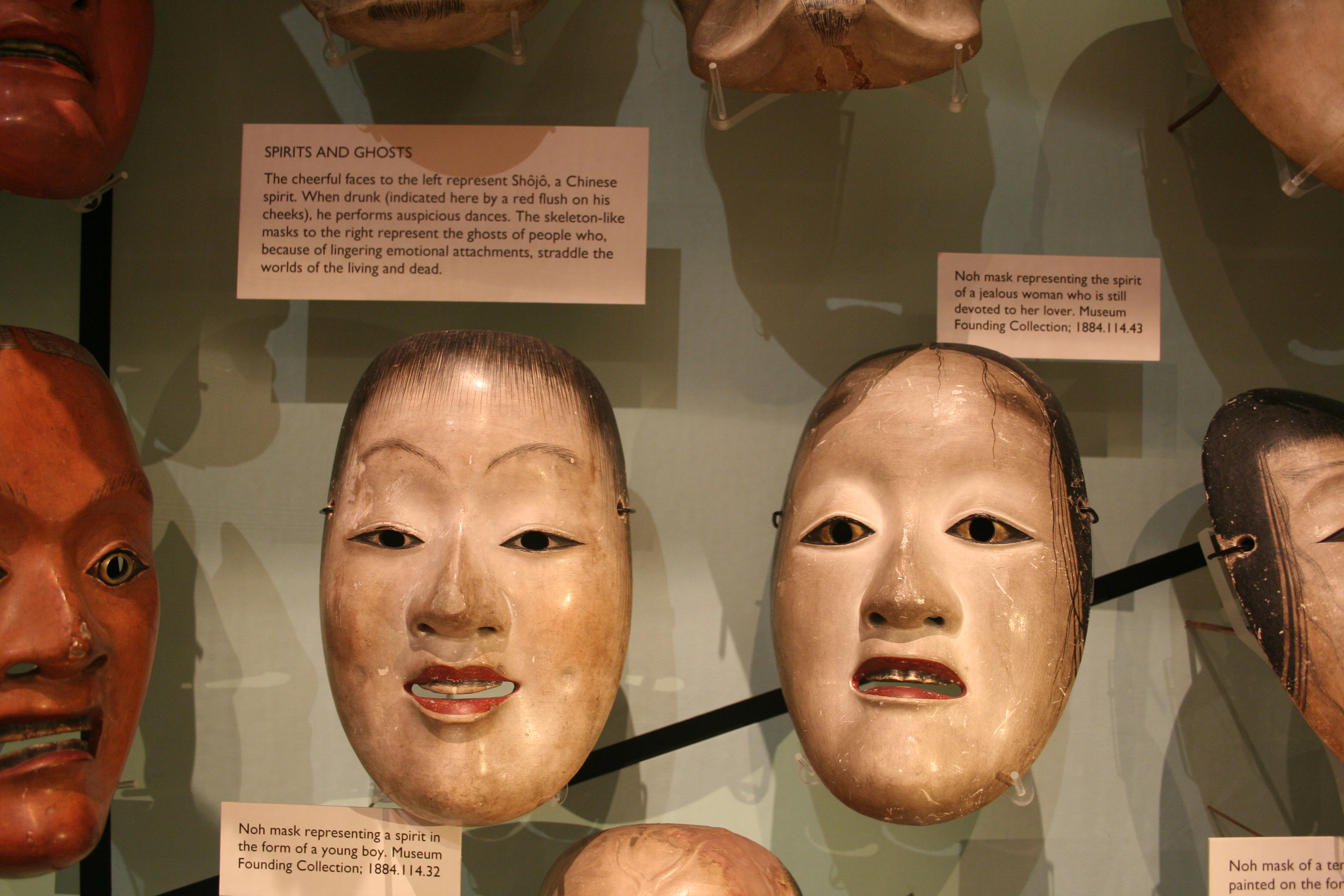
Japanese Noh masks

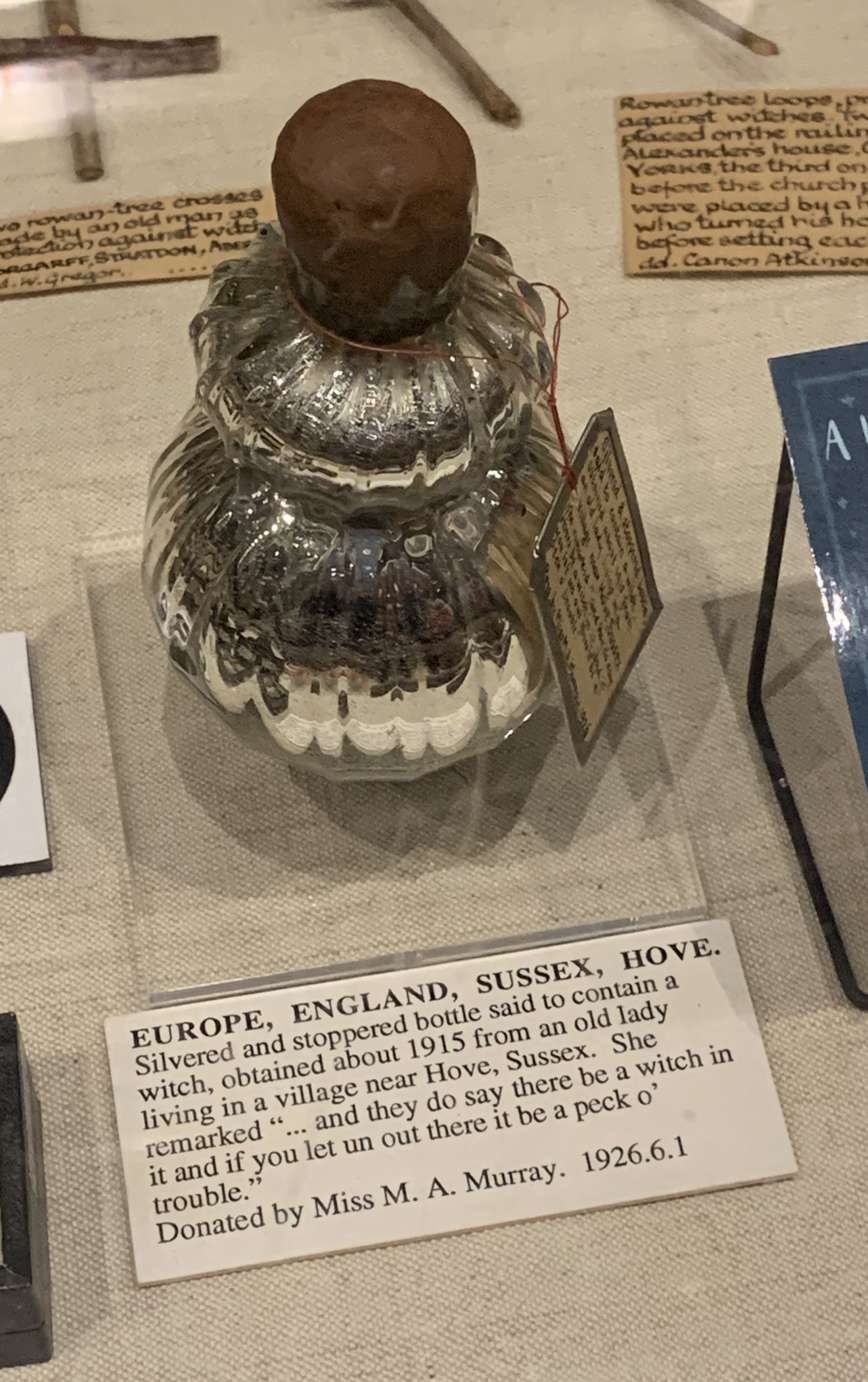
Witch in a Bottle, Hove, Sussex

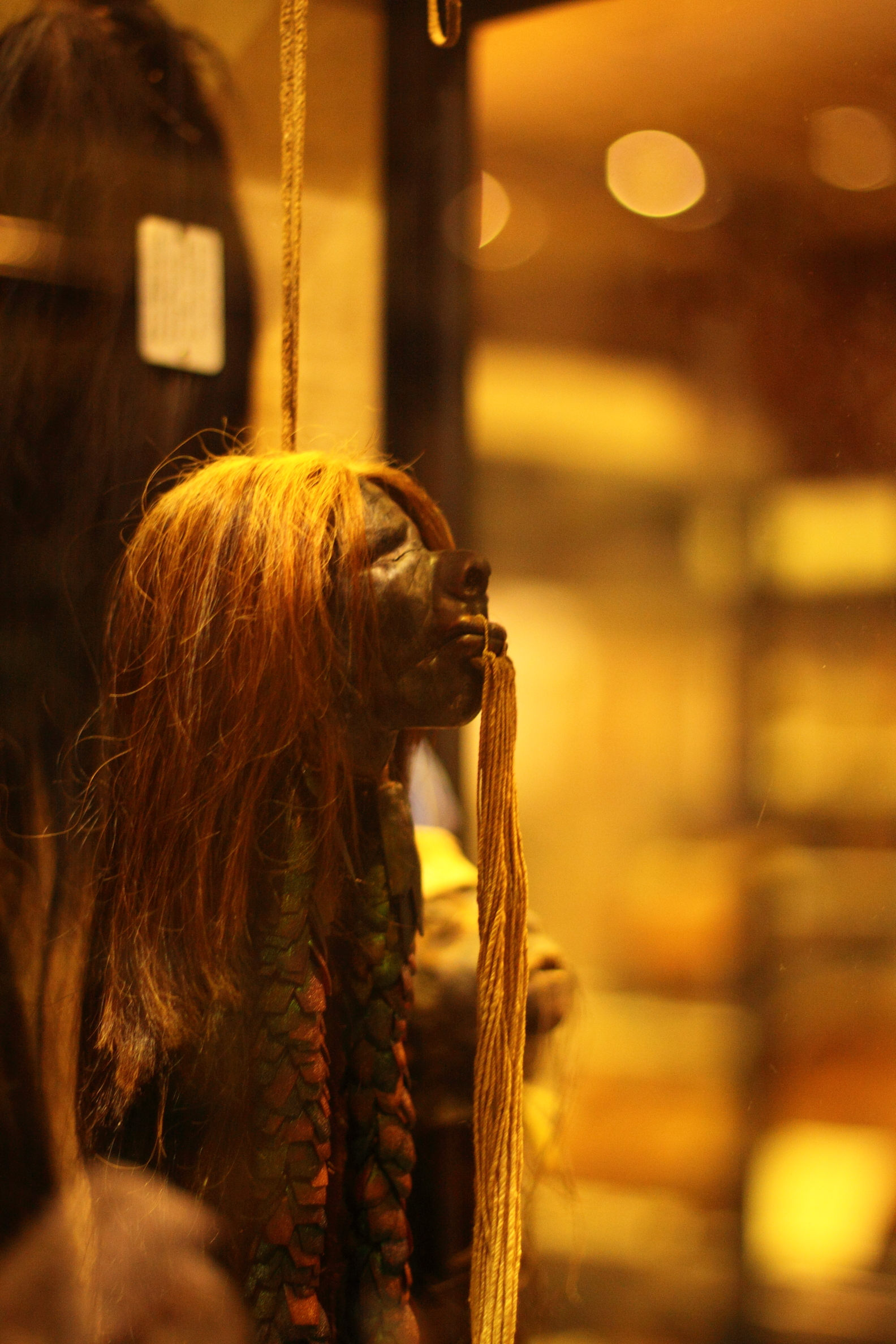
Shrunken head, photo circa 2009. This item, as well as most other human remains, were removed from display in 2020.

== Expansion ==
Despite the Pitt Rivers being so full as to be "bursting at the seams", designs for a new museum building in the 1960s were never realised. By 1964, the university wanted to expand the science area onto the Pitts Rivers site and move the museum to a larger plot on Banbury Road. A round museum was proposed, covering a site larger than the Sheldonian Theatre, the Clarendon Building, and the Bodleian Library combined. The concept was strongly supported by the museum's curator Bernard Fagg and, after concerted lobbying from Fagg, the university's Standing Committee on Museums and Galleries. In February 1966, the university greenlit the new museum and promised to keep the Banbury Road site free for three years while funding was arranged. Several architects were considered for the project including Leslie Martin (who was already working on plans for a new zoology building), Powell & Moya, and Pier Luigi Nervi; Nervi was selected and planning applications were submitted and approved by Oxford City Council in a 32-29 vote. The new museum needed £4.5 million to cover construction costs and £2.25 million as an endowment. In May 1968, Fagg suffered a stroke which left him in hospital until the end of the academic year and significantly limited his involvement in fundraising efforts. By 1970, the campaign had lost momentum, the fundraising committee dissolved, and in September, the university announced the project would be shelved.

In 2004, the museum received £3,700,000 from the Higher Education Funding Council for England (HEFCE) to build an annex adjoining the museum. Building work was completed in 2007, bringing the academic staff of the museum back to the site, and providing a laboratory for conservation of the specimens.

A second phase of development began on 7 July 2008 necessitating the closure of the museum and galleries. The museum reopened on 1 May 2009. In this work, the 1960s exhibition gallery was dismantled, restoring the original view through to the museum's totem pole. Original display cases were returned to their original place at the front of the museum. The space upstairs vacated by these cases provides additional space for a Clore Duffield Education Centre. A new entrance platform was built to allow visitors to enter on the same level as the Oxford University Museum of Natural History and improves access for wheelchair users and parents with pushchairs. The entrance platform provides re-located shop and reception areas. An environmental control system was also installed.

== Multaka network ==
In 2019, the museum joined six similar museums in Germany, Italy, Greece and Switzerland, creating the international Multaka network. This intercultural museum project organizes guided tours for refugees and migrants designed and offered for free by specially trained Arabic-speaking Multaka guides. The visitor-centered discussions with migrants in their language are focused on the historical origin and history of acquisition of cultural objects, including the visitors' own understanding of their country's cultural heritage.

== Awards ==
The Pitt Rivers Museum, along with the Oxford University Museum of Natural History, won The Guardian newspaper's award for Family Friendly Museum of 2005. In 2019, the Pitt Rivers Museum was finalist of the Art Fund Museum of the Year Award.

== Colonial legacy ==
In recent years, the Pitt Rivers Museum has been called sector-leading in its work on decoloniality. Further details can be found on the website.^{[Expansion needed]}

In September 2020, the museum announced it had made a number of critical changes to its displays, including the removal from display of human remains and the installation of a new Introductory Case as an intervention in its permanent galleries that engages with the colonial legacy of the museum. The changes attracted worldwide attention as they involved the removal of the museum's collection of shrunken heads, which had been on display since the 1940s, citing the reason that "the displays reinforced racist and stereotypical thinking that goes against the museum’s values today". The museum has also said that it would make changes to the labels to include stories "through the voices of artists and indigenous leaders".

As part of this process the Pitt Rivers Museum is meeting with originating communities to address errors and gaps in the information it stores, and to discuss repatriation. One of these is the Living Cultures initiative, a collaboration between the museum, a Maasai community based campaign group called Oltoilo Le Maa, and community development organisation InsightShare. Additionally, the museum, together with the Museum of Natural History, returned the remains of 17 Aboriginal Australians to the Australian government in 2022. In 2026 the museum repatriated the skeletal remains of a number of Naga people including some which had been displayed in a case titled Treatment of Dead Enemies.

== Notable people ==
- Henry Balfour (curator)
- Beatrice Blackwood (curator, anthropologist)
- Leonard Halford Dudley Buxton (anthropologist)
- Elizabeth Edwards (curator, historian of photography)
- Bernard Fagg (curator, archaeologist)
- Barbara Freire-Marreco (anthropologist)
- Chris Gosden (archaeologist)
- Clare Harris (curator for Asian Collections)
- Dan Hicks (curator)
- Schuyler Jones (American anthropologist)
- Margaret Staples-Browne (Makereti) (Māori anthropologist)
- Howard Morphy (anthropologist)
- Michael Palin (patron)
- Augustus Henry Lane Fox Pitt Rivers (archaeologist and donor of founding collection)
- Edward Burnett Tylor (anthropologist)

== See also ==
- Oxford University Museum of Natural History
- Museums of the University of Oxford
- Ashmolean Museum
- Museum of Oxford
- Museum of the History of Science, Oxford
- Museum of Archaeology and Anthropology, University of Cambridge
