= Primitive Culture (book) =

Work by Edward Tylor (1871)

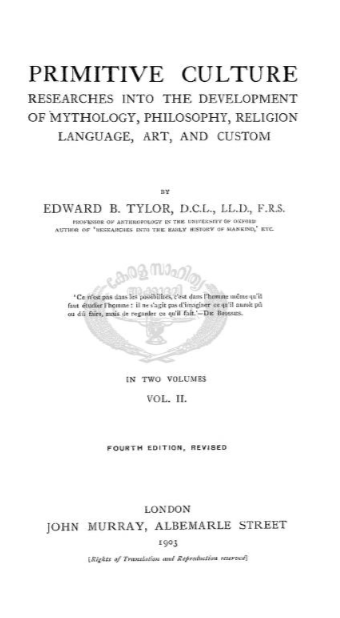
- Title page for Primitive Culture (1903)
- Author: Edward Burnett Tylor
- Subject: Cultural anthropology
- Published: 1871

Primitive Culture is an 1871 book by Edward Burnett Tylor. In his book, Tylor debates the relationship between "primitive" societies and "civilized" societies, a key theme in 19th century anthropological literature.

== Evolutionism ==
Tylor's work can be connected to theories present in 19th century literature including Lewis Henry Morgan's "ethnical periods". Among 19th century anthropologists, many saw what now may be called "tribal" states and societies, as lacking in form, progress, and development. Both Tylor and Morgan aligned somewhat with this viewpoint, Morgan believing in stages in order from savagery, barbarism, to civilization, and Tylor concluding that savagery is the lower stage of civilization. Tylor; unlike Morgan however; believed in "Prichardian Ethnological Monogenism", something he learnt in turn during his travels in Mexico from Henry Christy (1810-1865). Today, most anthropologists generally believe these views to be unsubstantiated.

== See also ==
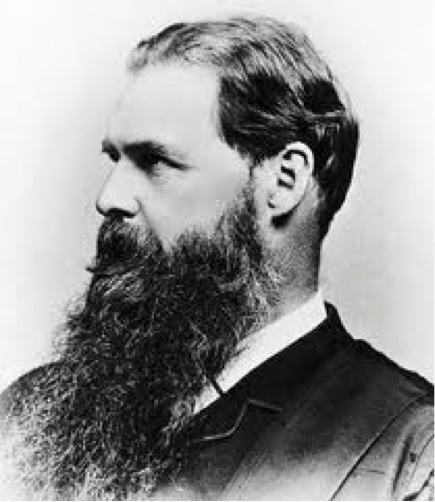
- Picture of Tylor
  American anthropology
- Civilization
- Ethnology
- Noble savage
- Primitivism
- Uncontacted peoples
