= List of whiskey distilleries in Ireland =

This is an incomplete list of whiskey distilleries in Ireland. According to the Irish Whiskey Association, as of March 2025, there are 50 operational distilleries on the Island of Ireland. However, many of these were recently established and had not yet aged their own spirits for sale as whiskey.

== Currently operating distilleries ==
Incomplete map of distilleries operating in Ireland (as of Mar. 2025)

Distillery	Location	Founded	Owner
Achill Island	County Mayo	2015	Independent
Ahascragh	County Galway	2018	Independent
Ardara	County Donegal	2020	Independent
Ballykeefe	County Kilkenny	2017	Independent
Baoilleach	County Donegal	2019	Independent
Blacks of Kinsale	County Cork	2015	Independent
Blackwater	County Waterford	2014	Independent
Boann	County Meath	2019	Independent
Burren	County Clare	2019	Independent
Church of Oak	County Kildare	2023	Independent
Clonakilty	County Cork	2016	Independent
Connacht	County Mayo	2014	Independent
Cooley	County Louth	1987	Suntory Global Spirits
Copeland	County Down	2019	Independent
Crolly	County Donegal	2020	Independent
Dingle	Dingle	2012	Porterhouse Group
Dublin Liberties	Dublin	2018	Independent
Echlinville	County Down	2013	Independent
Fore	County Westmeath	2021	Independent
Glendalough	County Wicklow	2013	Mark Anthony Group
Glendree	County Clare	2019	Independent
Great Northern	County Louth	2015	John Teeling
Hinch	County Down	2020	Independent
Kilbeggan	Kilbeggan	1757	Suntory Global Spirits
Killarney	County Kerry	2020	Independent
Killowen	County Down	2019	Independent
Lough Gill	County Sligo	2019	Sazerac Company
Lough Mask	County Mayo	2019	Independent
Lough Ree	County Longford	2018	Independent
McConnell’s	Belfast	2024	Belfast Distillery Company
Micil	Galway	2016	Independent
Midleton	Midleton	1975	Pernod Ricard
Old Bushmills	Bushmills	1784	Proximo Spirits
Pearse Lyons	Dublin	2017	Independent
Powerscourt	County Wicklow	2018	Independent
Rademon Estate	County Down	2015	Independent
Roe & Co	Dublin	2019	Diageo
Royal Oak	County Carlow	2016	Independent
Scott’s Irish Whiskey	County Fermanagh	2019	Independent
Slane	County Meath	2018	Brown-Forman
Teeling	Dublin	2015	Bacardi Limited
The Shed	County Leitrim	2013	Independent
Tipperary	County Tipperary	2020	Independent
Titanic	Belfast	2023	Titanic Distillers
Tullamore	Tullamore	2014	William Grant & Sons
West Cork	County Cork	2003	Independent
Wild Atlantic	County Tyrone	2019	Independent

Old Carrick Mill Distillery 2014 County Monaghan Independent

== Closed distilleries ==
Distillery	Location	Founded	Year closed
Bandon	Bandon	1826	1929
Birr	County Offaly	1805	1889
Bishop's Water	Wexford	1827	1915
Burt	Burt	1814	1841
Daly's	Cork	1807	1807
Dundalk	Dundalk	1708	1926
Green	Cork	1796	1870
Hackett's	Midleton	1824	1845
Jones Road	Dublin	1873	1945
John's Lane	Dublin	1796	1976
Limavady	Limavady	1805	1914
Marlfield	Marlfield	1817	1856
Marrowbone Lane	Dublin	1752	1923
North Mall	Cork	1779	1920
Nun's Island	Galway	1846	1915
Old Jameson	Dublin	1780	1971
Old Midleton	Midleton	1825	1975
Old Tullamore	Tullamore	1829	1954
Royal Irish	Belfast	1868	1938
Thomas Street	Dublin	1757	1926
Watercourse	Cork	1795	1975
Waterford	Waterford	2016	2024

== Bibliography ==
- Amber, Kate (2018). Ireland's Whiskey Guide. Amber Publisher.
- Mulryan, Peter (2024). The Whiskeys of Ireland. O'Brien Press, Limited.
- Townsend, Brian (1999). The Lost Distilleries of Ireland. Neil Wilson.
