= Paddy Whiskey =

Brand of blended Irish whiskey

Paddy

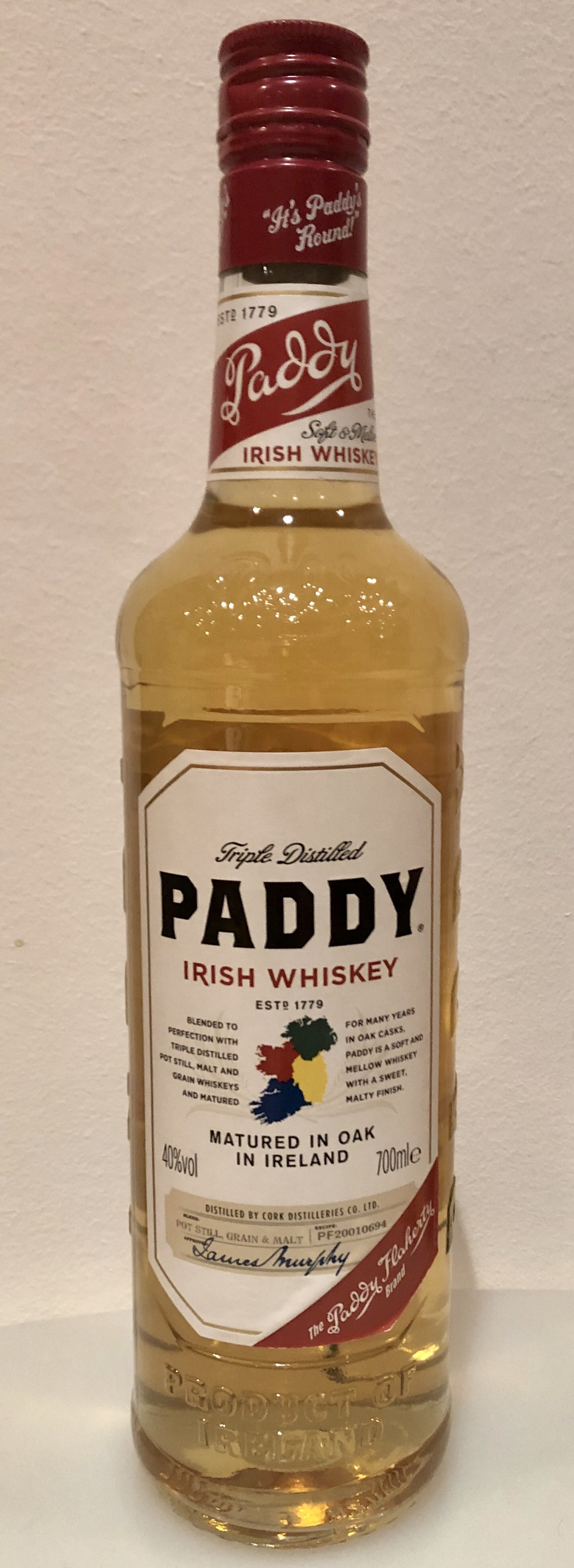
- Type: Irish whiskey
- Manufacturer: Sazerac
- Origin: Ireland
- Introduced: 1879, renamed as Paddy in 1912
- Alcohol by volume: 40%
- Related products: Jameson, Powers, Tullamore Dew

Paddy is a brand of blended Irish whiskey produced by the Sazerac Company. As of 2016, Paddy is the fourth largest-selling Irish whiskey in the world.

== History ==
The Cork Distilleries Company was founded in 1867 to merge four existing distilleries in Cork city (the North Mall, the Green, Watercourse Road, and Daly's) under the control of one group. A fifth distillery, the Old Midleton Distillery, joined the group soon after in 1868.

In 1882, the company hired a young Corkman called Paddy Flaherty as a salesman. Flaherty travelled the pubs of County Cork marketing the company's unwieldy named "Cork Distilleries Company Old Irish Whiskey". His sales techniques (which included free rounds of drinks for customers) were so good, that when publicans ran low on stock they would write to the distillery to reorder cases of "Paddy Flaherty's whiskey". In 1912, with his name having become synonymous with the whiskey, the distillery officially renamed the whiskey Paddy Irish Whiskey in his honour.

In the 1920s and 1930s in Ireland, whiskey was sold in casks from the distillery to wholesalers, who would in turn sell it on to publicans. To prevent fluctuations in quality due to middlemen diluting their casks, Cork Distilleries Company decided to bottle their own whiskey known as Paddy, becoming one of the first to do so.

== Present Day ==
In 1988, following an unsolicited takeover offer by Grand Metropolitan, Irish Distillers approached Pernod Ricard and subsequently became a subsidiary of the French drinks conglomerate, following a friendly takeover bid.

In 2016, Pernod Ricard sold the Paddy brand to Sazerac, a privately held American firm for an undisclosed fee. Pernod Ricard stated that the sale was in order to "simplify" their portfolio, and allow for more targeted investment in their other Irish whiskey brands, such as Jameson and Powers.

At the time of the sale, Paddy was the fourth largest-selling Irish whiskey brand in the world, with sales of 200,000 9-litre cases per annum in 28 countries.

For the American market, the whiskey was rebranded as "Paddy's" but the product is the same as that still sold in Ireland as "Paddy."

In 2020, Paddy's was named the Best Blended Irish Whiskey at the International Whiskey Competition. The whiskey also earned a silver medal and second place for Best Irish Whiskey at the event.

== Blend ==
Paddy whiskey is distilled three times and matured in oak casks for up to seven years. Compared with other Irish whiskeys, Paddy has a comparatively low pot still content and a high malt content in its blend.

Jim Murray, author of the Whisky Bible, has rated Paddy as "one of the softest of all Ireland's whiskeys".
