= Mary Locke =

Mary Locke may refer to:

- Mary Locke (writer) (1768–1816), English poet and children's author
- Mary Anne Locke (1831–1889), Irish distiller and philanthropist
- Mary "Muds" Locke (1863–1943), Irish director of Locke's Distillery
