= Cork Distilleries Company =

Irish whiskey distilling company

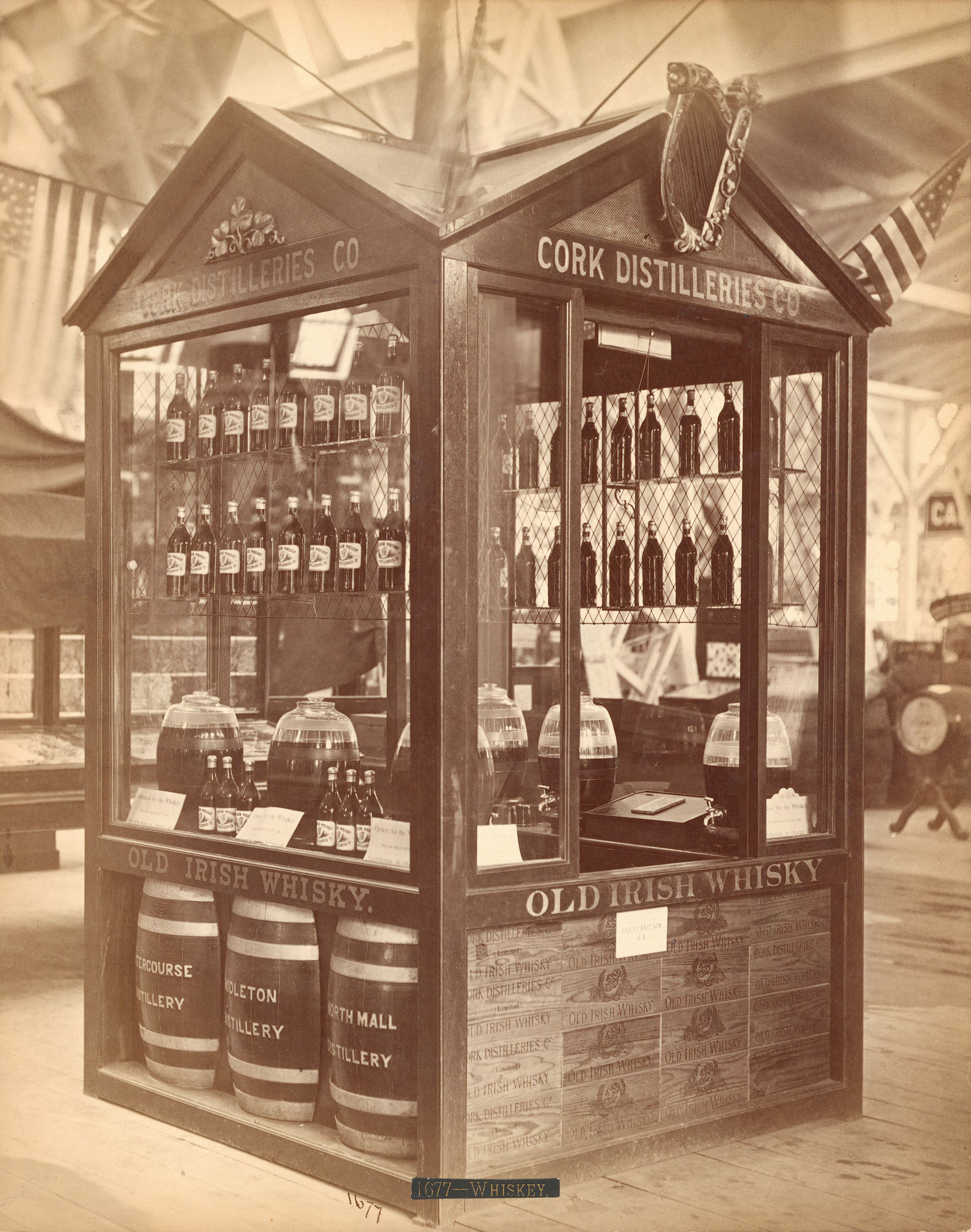
- The Cork Distilleries exhibit at the US Centennial Exhibition, Philadelphia, 1876
- Founded: 1867
- Defunct: 1966
- Fate: Merged with John Power & Son and John Jameson & Son
- Successor: Irish Distillers
- Headquarters: Cork / Midleton
- Key people: James Murphy
- Products: Irish whiskey, Gin

Cork Distilleries Company was an Irish whiskey distilling company. It was formed in 1867, when four Cork distilleries, Daly's, the Green, North Mall, the Watercourse were amalgamated under one company to form the Cork Distilleries Company. In 1868, these were joined by another Cork distillery, James Murphy's Midleton Distillery. The company existed until 1966, when the Cork Distilleries Company merged with two other Irish distillers, John Powers & Son and John Jameson & Son, to form Irish Distillers.

The company produced Paddy Whiskey, and Cork Dry Gin among other products.

== History ==
In the mid-1800s, the Irish whiskey industry underwent a period of turmoil, with the temperance movement of the 1830s, and the Great Famine of the 1840s reducing domestic demand for whiskey. At the time, Cork was home to several distilleries, therefore, in the 1860s, James Murphy, the owner of the Midleton distillery, suggested amalgamating the operations of several local distilleries.

The other distilleries agreed, so in 1867, Cork Distilleries Company (CDC) was formed, with Murphy at the helm. In 1867, CDC took control of four Cork distilleries: North Mall, The Green, the Watercourse and Daly's, and a year later Midleton Distillery also joined.

The years that followed its formation saw some rationalisation, with distilling ceasing at Daly's Distillery in 1869, and at the Green in the 1870s. Though both continued to be used as warehouses by the Cork Distilleries Company for several years. The Watercourse Distillery was also mothballed in the mid-1880s, so that by the turn of the century, only two of CDC's five distilleries, the North Mall and Midleton -remained in production.

In 1920, a fire broke out at the North Mall distillery, completely destroying its five-storey mill, and causing significant damage to most, if not all of the production buildings. Had the Irish whiskey industry not been in the midst of a crisis, with most distilleries enduring severe financial hardship, the distillery might have been rebuilt. However, facing an uncertain economic outlook, a decision was taken to concentrate production at Midleton, rather than to renovate the North Mall Distillery.

In 1966, with the Irish distilleries still facing an uncertain future, CDC merged with two of the other remaining Dublin distilleries, John Jameson & Son. and John Powers & Son., to form Irish Distillers.
