= Midleton Distillery =

The Midleton Distillery may refer to:

- The Old Midleton Distillery, also known as the Jameson Experience, Midleton, a distillery which operated in Midleton, County Cork, Ireland from 1825 to 1975
- The New Midleton Distillery, a new distillery built alongside the existing Old Midleton Distillery, opened in 1975
