= Hackett's Distillery =

Hackett’s Distillery
- Location: Midleton
- Coordinates: 51°55′24.8″N 8°10′53.7″W
- Founded: 1824
- Founder: James Hackett
- Status: Defunct
- No. of stills: 2 pot stills (1 Wash still: 7,960 gallons; and 1 Low wines still: 4,664 gallons)
- Capacity: 200,000 gallons per annum

Hackett's Distillery was an Irish whiskey distillery which operated in Midleton, County Cork, Ireland between 1824 and circa 1845.

== History ==
Established in 1824 by the Hacketts, a wealthy local family, who had made their fortune in the tanning industry, Hackett's Distillery had a brief yet tumultuous existence.

Built at a cost of £20,000, the extensive operation included a distillery, a dwelling house, two flour mills, kilns, stores, and other buildings. Initially successful, by the 1830s the distillery was producing about 200,000 gallons of spirit per annum, with a payroll of 60.

However, success was not to last. The distillery incurred large debts, and likely suffered from falling demand due to the effects of Fr. Matthew's Temperance Movement. Ironically, Fr. Matthew was in fact a close relative of the Hacketts, his brother being married to their sister. However, the nail in coffin for the distillery seems to have been an incident in 1842, which occurred after an Excise Officer visited the distillery late in the evening requesting that the gates be closed and the property inspected. The visit apparently incited an angry reaction from Bartholomew Hackett, one of the senior partners in the firm and present on site at the time. Though the precise events are unclear, the Excise Officer subsequently filed a suit against the Hacketts, alleging assault, and obstruction of an Excise Officer in the discharge of his duties, the latter of which was a serious charge for a distiller.

For reasons which were later disputed in court, the Hacketts did not file an official plea against the latter charge within the required timeframe, and were found guilty by default. The consequences of which were most severe: withdrawal of their license to distill, imposition of a large fine, and the forced sale of their distillery.

The distilling equipment, and 1,500 gallons (about 75 casks) of overproof spirits, and 1,800 gallons of “feints at proof” were advertised for sale in 1843. However, sale of the equipment does not seem to have proceeded, as the distillery was sold in “perfect working order” some years later.

In 1845, the Hacketts won a suit against their attorney, claiming that he had been negligent in failing to file a plea of “not guilty” against the charge of “obstruction”. They were awarded £250 and costs, an amount which paled in comparison with the loss of their investment in the distillery. A lengthy summary of the case was outlined in the 12 December 1845 edition of The Cork Examiner.

In 1850, the distillery was sold in the “Incumbered Estates Court” (Bankruptcy Court) for the sum of £3,000, far below its reported value of £7,000. The winning bidder, a Mrs. O’Donoghue is thought to have been a sister of the Hacketts.

Although reported to have been sold in “perfect working order”, there is no record of distilling having resumed at the property.

In the 1850s, the property again made its way into the “Incumbered Estates Court”, being purchased on this occasion by “Messrs. Allin”, who repurposed it for milling corn.

The decline in fortunes appears to have been most severe for Bartholomew Hackett. Reduced to near penury, he was prevented from seeking aid due to his social status. In 1853, he considered turning to smuggling illicit spirits to make ends meet. Later, he applied for a position as a distiller at Murphy's Midleton Distillery. Murphy's, a large enterprise which had opened in 1825, just months after Hackett's, and the only other distillery in Midleton, had been their chief business rival. Writing himself, he noted that he would have to “sink all his pride in doing so”.

== See also ==
- Jameson Experience, Midleton

== Bibliography ==
- Townsend, Brian (1997–1999). The Lost Distilleries of Ireland. Glasgow: Angels' Share (Neil Wilson Publishing). ISBN 1897784872.
