= Mary "Muds" Locke =

- Born: Mary Edwards; 1863; Count Westmeath, Ireland
- Died: 1943 (aged 79–80); Dublin

Mary "Muds" Locke (1863–1943) was an Irish director of Locke's Distillery and divorcee.

== Life ==
Mary Locke was born Mary Edwards in 1863. She was one of ten children. When her father died while working as an engineer on the railways at Mullingar under William Dargan, the family were left impoverished. Locke was 17 when she married John Edward Locke, the son of John and Mary Anne Locke in 1881. The couple lived in Brusna House beside Locke's Distillery. They had two daughters, Mary Evelyn known as Sweet, and Florence Emily known as Flo.

Due to her interest in hunting and the Westmeath Hunt, Locke earned the nickname "Muds". She had a number of extramarital affairs with men in the area, leading to her husband forcing her out of their home in 1895. He began divorce proceedings in February 1896. This drew much attention due to the prominence of the Locke family and their association with the Mercy convent in Kilbeggan. When the divorce was finalised, Locke received an annual allowance of £600, and despite her reduced circumstances, she continued to take part in the Westmeath Hunt and was among the first women in Westmeath to drive a car. After her divorce, she lived in Ballinagore house, near Kilbeggan with her children.

Locke travelled to France after the outbreak of World War I, working in various hospitals with the Red Cross. She returned to Ireland and worked with the Westmeath Auxiliary Red Cross Hospital in Mullingar. She was later awarded medals from the French government for her work. She had been a shareholder in Locke's distillery after her ex-husband's death in 1920, but did not become a director until the death of her brother-in-law, James Harvey Locke. She held the post until her death, but had a limited role in the company. Locke died in 1943 in a Dublin nursing home.
