= Cork Dry Gin =

Irish gin

- Type: Gin
- Manufacturer: Irish Distillers
- Origin: Ireland
- Introduced: Circa. 1793
- Alcohol by volume: 37.5%
- Colour: Clear

Cork Dry Gin is an Irish gin. First produced in Cork in the Watercourse Distillery circa 1793. Since 1975, Cork Dry Gin has been manufactured by Irish Distillers, a subsidiary of Pernod Ricard, at their Midleton Distillery. Cork Dry Gin is the largest selling gin brand in Ireland.

Until recently, bottles of Cork Dry Gin still featured the name of the Cork Distilleries Company, which had purchased the Watercourse Distillery in 1867 and owned it until its subsequent merger with two other Irish distilleries to form Irish Distillers in 1966.
