= Irish whiskey =

Popular spirit made in Ireland

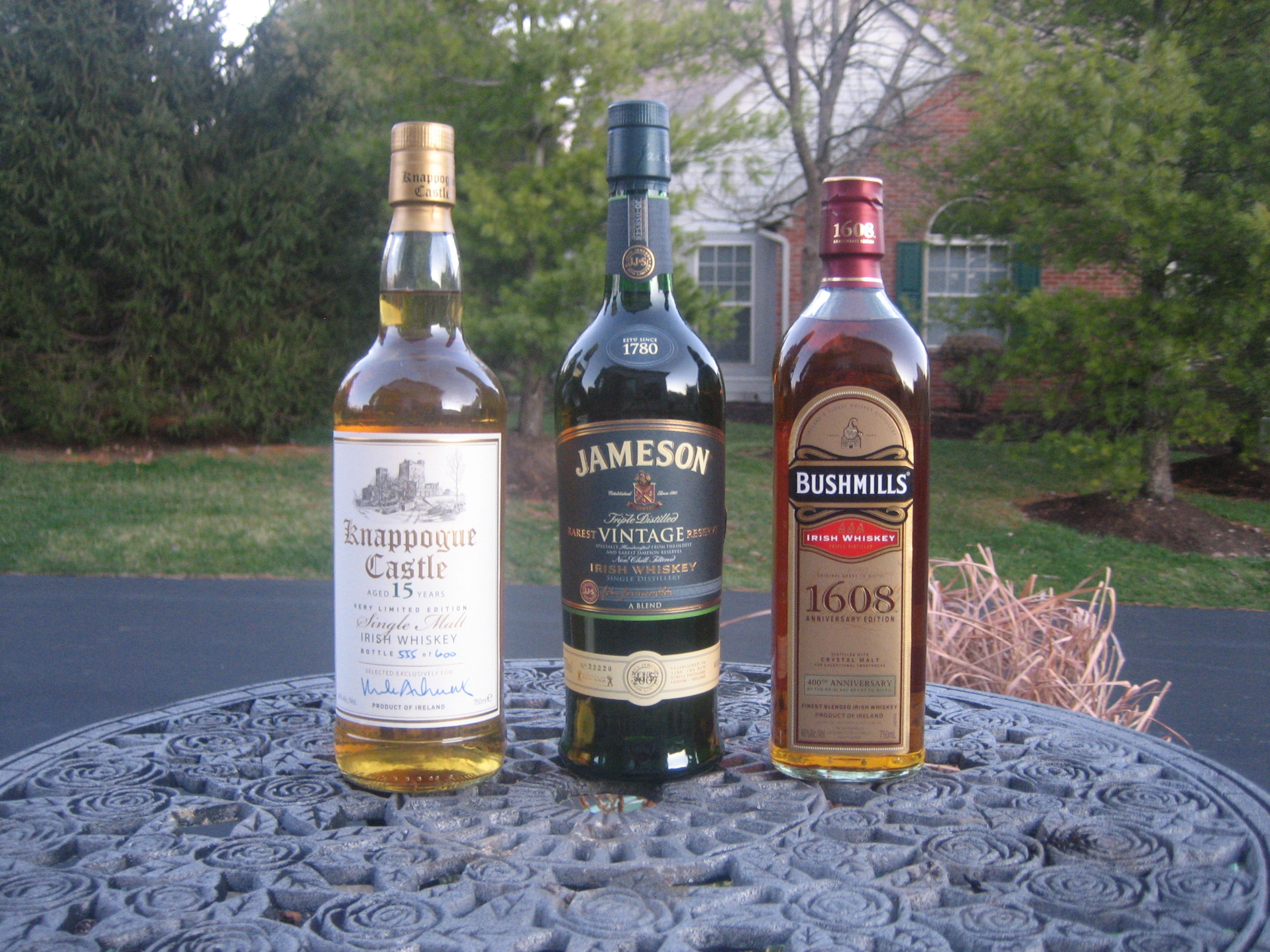
- Three Irish whiskeys: Knappogue Castle, Jameson, and Bushmills
- Type: Distilled beverage
- Origin: Ireland
- Introduced: 13th–15th century
- Alcohol by volume: 40–94.8%
- Proof (US): 80–189.6° (US) / 70–166° (UK)
- Colour: Pale gold to dark amber
- Flavour: smooth, sharp, hint of vanilla
- Ingredients: Malt, water
- Variants: Pot Still Irish Whiskey; Malt Irish Whiskey; Grain Irish Whiskey; Blended Irish Whiskey
- Related products: Scotch, English, Welsh

Irish whiskey (Irish: Fuisce or uisce beatha) is whiskey made on the island of Ireland. The word 'whiskey' (or whisky) comes from the Irish uisce beatha, meaning water of life. Irish whiskey was once the most popular spirit in the world, though a long period of decline from the late 19th century onwards greatly damaged the industry, so much so that although Ireland boasted at least 28 distilleries in the 1890s, by 1966 this number had fallen to just two, and by 1972 the remaining distilleries, Bushmills Distillery and Old Midleton Distillery (replaced by New Midleton Distillery), were owned by just one company, Irish Distillers.

The monopoly situation was ended by an academically conceived launch of the first new distillery in decades, Cooley Distillery, in 1987. Since 1990, Irish whiskey has seen a resurgence in popularity and has been the fastest-growing spirit in the world every year since. With exports growing by over 15% per annum, existing distilleries have been expanded and a number of new distilleries constructed. As of December 2019, Ireland has 32 distilleries in operation, with more either planned or under development.

== History ==
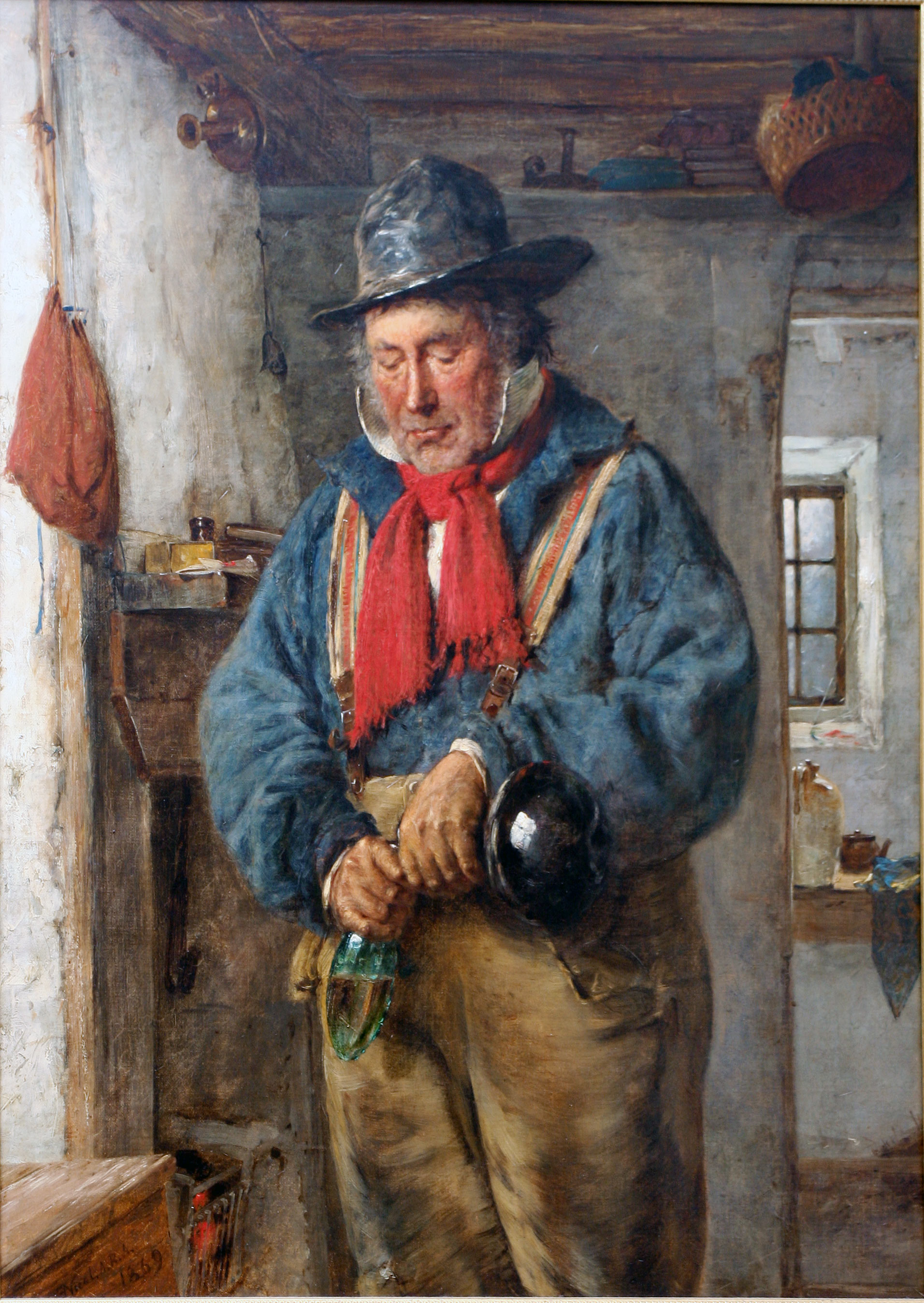
Erskine Nicol – A Nip Against the Cold – An Irishman pouring whiskey 1869. Part of Erskine Nicol Irish collection, painting of Irish life.

Irish whiskey was one of the earliest distilled drinks in Europe, arising around the 12th century. It is believed that Irish monks brought the technique of distilling perfumes back to Ireland from their travels to southern Europe around 1,000 AD. The Irish then modified this technique to obtain a drinkable spirit.

Although termed "whiskey", the spirit produced during this period would have differed from what is currently recognised as whiskey, as it would not have been aged, and was often flavoured with aromatic herbs such as mint, thyme, or anise. Irish Mist, a whiskey liqueur launched in 1963, is purportedly based on such a recipe.

Although known to have occurred for hundreds of years, records of whiskey production in Ireland can be difficult to come by, particularly in the earlier years when production was unregulated. Even in later years, as production was frequently illicit, official records bear little resemblance to reality. In addition, as many Irish records were traditionally oral rather than written, details on early production are likely lost.

The oldest known documented record of whiskey in Ireland was in 1405; in the Annals of Clonmacnoise it was written that the head of a clan died after "taking a surfeit of aqua vitae" at Christmas. Its first known mention in Scotland dates from 1494. However, it is known that by 1556 whiskey was widespread, as an act passed by the Parliament of Ireland (3 & 4 Phil. & Mar. c. 7 (I)) declared whiskey to be "a drink nothing profitable to be drunken daily and used, is now universally throughout this realm made". This act also made it technically illegal for anyone other than "the peers, gentlemen and freemen of larger towns" to distil spirits without a licence from the Lord Deputy. However, as Crown control did not extend far beyond the Pale, a fortified area around Dublin, this had little effect. Irish whiskey is also described in Aqua Vitæ: its commodities describ'd by Richard Stanyhurst.

=== Start of licensed distillation ===
In 1608, King James I granted a licence to Sir Thomas Phillips, a landowner in County Antrim. Today Kilbeggan Distillery in Kilbeggan, County Westmeath, lays claim to the title of oldest distillery in Ireland, as the first distillery in Kilbeggan was established in 1757 (although not continuously operating since – e.g., the Kilbeggan Distillery was entirely shut down around 1917 and again between 1954 and 2007 and was "in rubble" and "totally derelict" by 1983). Despite this the licence was continuously paid and whiskey is currently distilled in Kilbeggan using the original 1757 licence. Kilbeggan also has what is believed to be the oldest operational copper pot still in the world, first used in 2007 after being "last used in the 19th century". However it is through the earlier 1608 licence that the Old Bushmills Distillery lays claim to being the oldest surviving grant of licence to distil in the world. However, the current Bushmills distillery and company was not registered to trade until 1784 and despite the promotion of the Phillips licence as its claimed founding date, the Bushmills distillery does not clearly descend from any distillery operated by Phillips through ownership or location.

In 1661, the Crown introduced a tax on whiskey production in Britain and Ireland. Therefore, in theory, all whiskey distillers in Ireland were to register and pay taxes. Although Crown control now extended far beyond the Pale, there is limited official record of whiskey distillation during this period. One reason for this is that, until 1761, registration was done on a voluntary basis. Therefore, as registration entailed paying a tax, it was much avoided for obvious reasons. Another reason is that those tasked with enforcing the law were frequently local landlords, and, if their tenants were the illicit distillers, it was not in their best interests to enforce the law. It is known, however, that more distillation occurred than is officially recorded, as when registration later became compulsory, several registrations detail the use of existing facilities.

From a regulatory perspective, the introduction of the act is a historical milestone as it provides a clear distinction between licit and illicit whiskey distillation in Ireland. For many years following its introduction, whiskey produced by registered distillers was known as "parliament whiskey", while that produced by illicit producers was, and still is referred to as Poitín, a Gaelic term meaning "small pot" (often anglicised as poteen) in reference to the small pot stills used by the illicit distillers. However, although traditionally the product of illicit production, many legal varieties of Poitín have come to market in recent years.

In the 18th century, demand for whiskey in Ireland grew significantly, driven both by strong population growth, and by displacing the demand for imported spirits. Growth in the latter is very much visible in the share of Irish duties paid on legal spirits in the late 1700s. In 1770, whiskey only accounted for 25% of the total duty on spirits received by the exchequer, while duty on imported rum accounted for 51%, with the remainder divided equally between brandy and gin. By 1790, however, whiskey's share accounted for 66%.

As a consequence of this increased demand, some distillers prioritized quantity over quality, to the detriment of their product. This prompted Parliament to pass the Distillation Act 1759 (33 Geo. 3. c. 9) prohibiting distillers from using any ingredient other than malt, grain, potatoes or sugar in the production of whiskey, and specifically prohibiting several unsavoury ingredients. Another consequence was that the potential revenue lost to the exchequer through the under-reporting of output at legal distilleries and the tax avoidance of illicit producers became more significant, prompting Parliament to introduce the Distillers Act 1779 (19 Geo. 3. c. 50). This significantly reformed how the taxes payable on whiskey production were calculated. Previously, taxes were payable on production volumes, which were subject to manipulation. However, this act removed the potential for under-reporting by making taxes payable on a distillery's potential output (based on the capacity of its pot stills), rather than its actual, or reported, output. In addition, the act penalised smaller distillers in an attempt to reduce reporting fraud.

Due to the stringency of this act, which made assumptions about output (for instance, a 500-gallon pot still was assumed to produce 33,075 gallons a month) and the minimum numbers of days which a still was in operation per annum (112), many of the smaller or less efficient registered distilleries were forced underground. In 1779, when the act was introduced, there were 1,228 registered distilleries in Ireland; however, by 1790, this number had fallen to 246, and by 1821, there were just 32 licensed distilleries in operation. This had the effect of concentrating licit distillation in a smaller number of distilleries based mainly in the larger urban centres, such as Cork and Dublin, which offered better markets for legal producers. In the rural areas distillation became a more illicit activity, in particular in the northwest of Ireland where agricultural lands were poorer and poitín provided a supplemental source of income to the tenant farmers, an income which landlords were again slow to curtail as it would have weakened their abilities to pay rent. The scale of this illicit activity was such that one surveyor estimated that duty was paid on only 2% of the spirit consumed in the northwestern provinces of Ulster and Connaught, while Aeneas Coffey (an excise officer at the time, and later inventor of the Coffey still) estimated that there were over 800 illicit stills in operation in Inishowen, County Donegal alone. By contrast, illicit distillation in Munster and Leinster was less extensive.

By some measures the act was successful, as the volume of whiskey on which excise was paid increased from 1.2 million to 2.9 million gallons. In addition, it prompted capital investments in establishing larger distilleries (which were more easily regulated), due to the need for economies of scale to profit from legal distillation. However, when demand for whiskey increased in the early 1800s, due to population growth, and changing consumption patterns (which saw it becoming more ingrained in Irish cultural activities), much of the demand was initially met by small-scale illicit distillers who did not need to pay tax or comply with the restrictions of the 1779 act. In fact, so much illicit spirit was available during this period that the licensed distillers in Dublin complained that it could be obtained "as openly in the streets as they sell a loaf of bread".

=== Reform and expansion ===
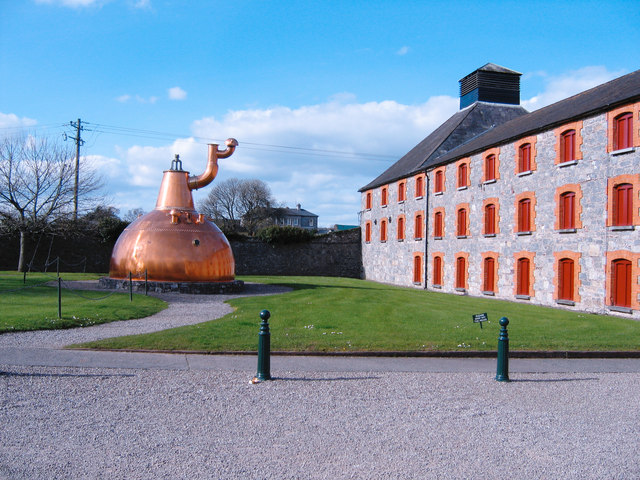
The Old Midleton Distillery, built in 1825, hosts a mammoth 31,618 gallon Pot still, so big that the still room needed to be built around it. Although no longer in use, it remains in place inside the old distillery building.

In 1823, the authorities, acknowledging the problems with the licensing system, cut the duties by half, and introduced the Excise Act 1823 (4 Geo. 4. c. 94) which significantly reformed the existing legislation, making legal distillation much more attractive. In particular, the reforms removed the need for distillers to rush production in order to produce as much (or more) whiskey than duties would be paid on, leading to improvements in fuel efficiency and product quality, as distillers could operate the stills at a more appropriate pace. In addition, restrictions on the type and capacity of stills used were removed, granting distillers more freedom to tailor their equipment. Another significant reform was a change to how duty was paid. Previously, duty was charged monthly, based on still output, meaning that distilleries paid tax on whiskey before it was sold. However, under the reforms, duty was to be paid only when the whiskey was actually sold, making its storage in bond more attractive, as less of the distillery's working capital would be tied up in already-taxed stock.

Together, these reforms greatly improved the distilling landscape, leading to a drop in illicit whiskey production and a boom in investment in legal distilleries. In 1821, two years before the reforms, there were 32 licensed distilleries in Ireland. Just four years later (in 1827), this number had risen to 82, and reached 93 by 1835, a 19th-century peak. The increased attractiveness of legal distillation is evident in the scale of the equipment used. Prior to the Excise Act 1823, the largest pot still in Ireland had a capacity of just 750 gallons. By 1825, however, the Old Midleton Distillery operated a 31,618-gallon pot still, which remains the largest ever built; Note: the largest pot still in operation in the world (as of 2014), located next door in the New Midleton Distillery, are roughly half this size, at 16,498 gallons (75,000 litres).

Domestic demand was reduced somewhat in the mid-1800s, due to the Temperance movement of the 1830s, and the Great Famine of the 1840s (during which a million Irish died and a million Irish emigrated). Between 1823 and 1900, however, whiskey output in Ireland still increased fourfold, and with access to the overseas markets provided by the British Empire, Irish whiskey became the most popular spirit in the world. "Dublin whiskey" was particularly well regarded.

=== Dublin whiskey peak ===
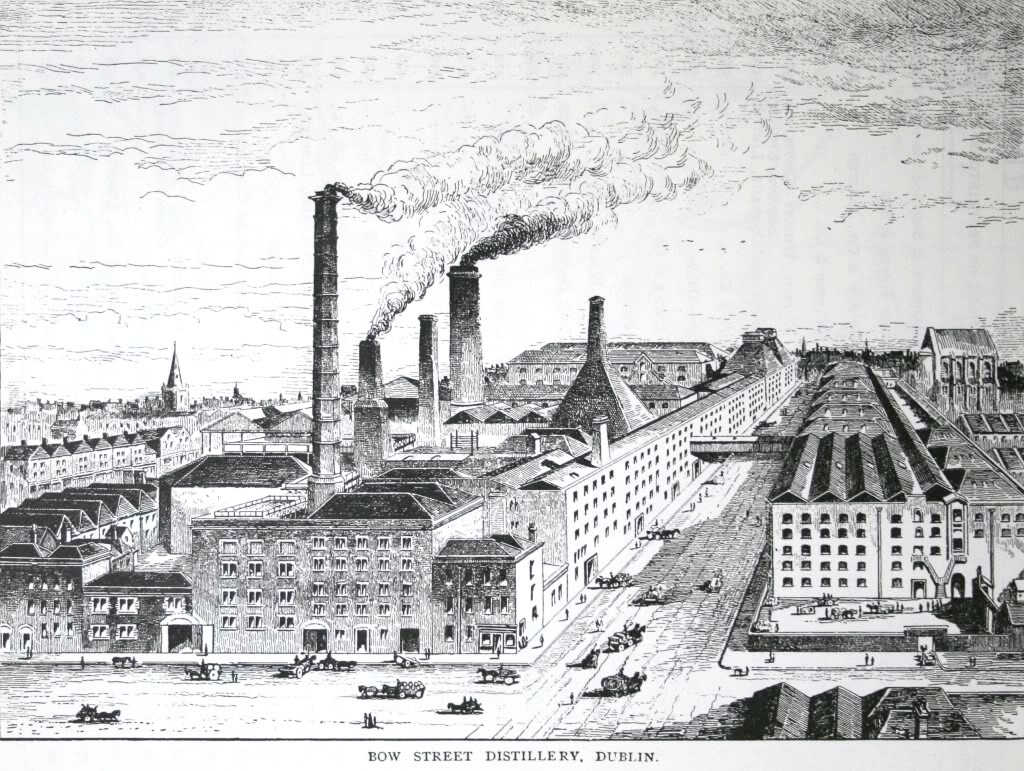
Jameson's Bow Street distillery pictured in Alfred Barnard's 1887 report on the distilleries of Britain and Ireland

In the early 1800s, Ireland was the largest spirit market in the United Kingdom, with demand for spirit exceeding that of more populous England. Therefore, as capacities expanded, Ireland became the largest producer of spirits in the United Kingdom; and Dublin, then the largest market for spirits in Ireland, emerged as a major distilling centre. By 1823, Dublin boasted the five largest licensed distilleries in the country. At their peak, the distilleries in Dublin would grow to become the largest in the world, with a combined output of almost 10 million gallons per annum, the largest of which, Roe's Thomas Street Distillery, had an output exceeding 2 million gallons per annum. By 1878, the reputation of Dublin whiskey was such that Distillers Company Ltd., a Scottish distilling firm, having built a distillery in Dublin, claimed that Dublin whiskey could sell for a 25% premium over other Irish whiskeys, and that it had a demand five times that of Scotch at the time. Although these figures are likely inflated, they give an indication of the esteem in which Dublin whiskey was held, even by Scottish distillers. During this period, the four largest Dublin distilling firms, of John Jameson, William Jameson, John Powers and George Roe (all family-run, and collectively known as the "Big Four") came to dominate the Irish distilling landscape. The chief output of these distilleries, known as single or "pure pot still" whiskey, was made from a mix of malted and unmalted barley, and solely distilled in pot stills. The style, having initially emerged as a means of avoiding a 1785 tax on malt, endured although the tax had been later repealed. In fact, even by the late 1880s, only two of Ireland's then 28 existing distilleries were producing single malt whiskey, the rest steadfast in their devotion to "pure pot still".

In this period, when Irish whiskey was at its zenith, it would have been difficult to imagine that Scotch, then produced by small-scale producers and almost unheard of outside of Scotland, would soon become the world's preeminent drink, while Irish whiskey, then the world's most popular whiskey, would enter a century of decline, culminating with all of Dublin's great distilleries shutting their doors. By the late 20th century, the once-popular pure pot still whiskey had almost disappeared entirely, with only two specialist bottlings, Green Spot and Redbreast remaining in existence. However, since 2010, several new single pot whiskeys have been launched.

=== Coffey still ===
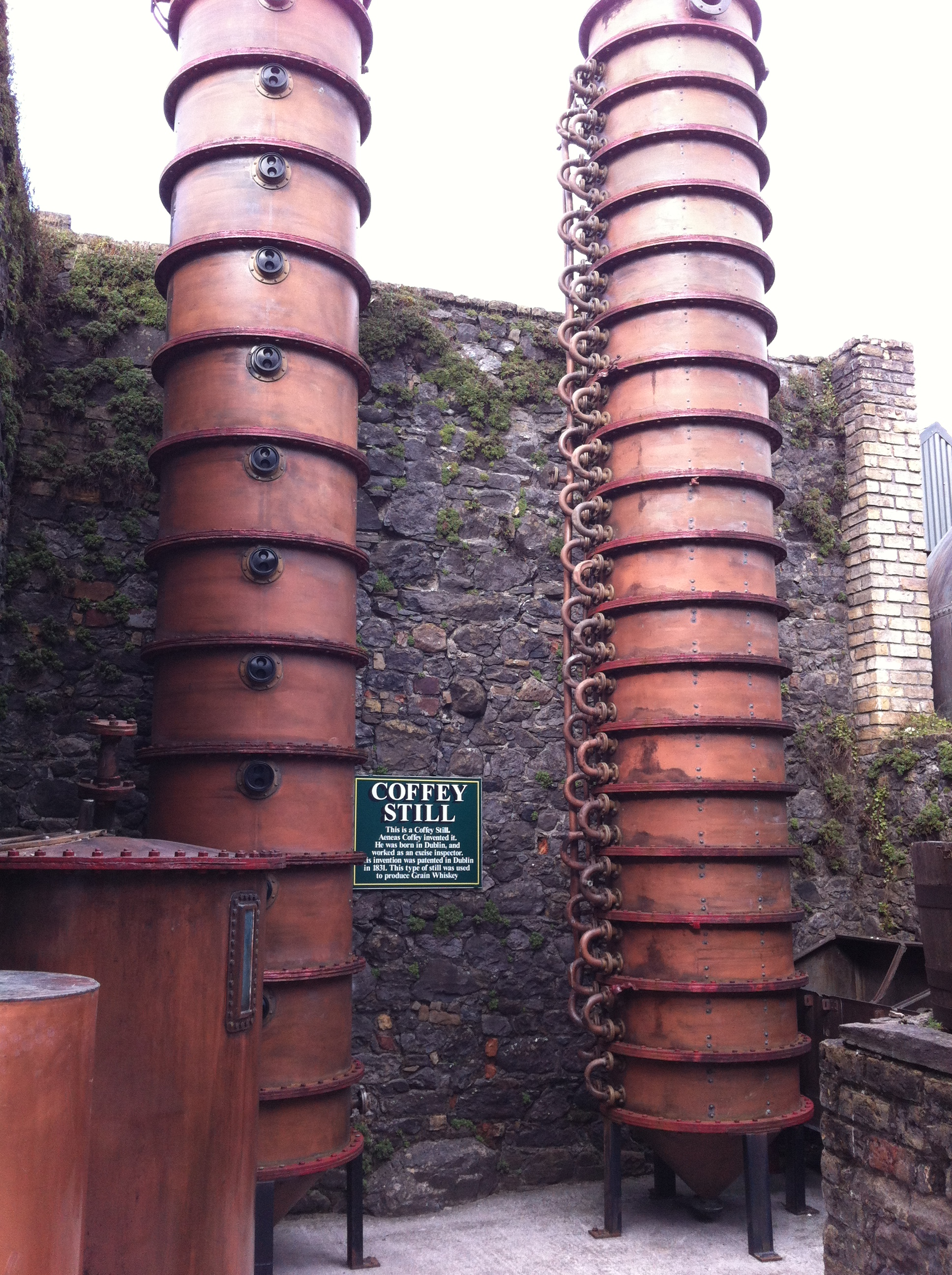
A Coffey still, installed at the old Tullamore Distillery in 1948, later lay unused outside the then closed Kilbeggan Distillery for several years.

There were a number of factors, both internal and external, which led to this decline. However, one of the main turning points was the patenting in 1832 of the Coffey still by Aeneas Coffey. Ironically, Coffey was both the former Inspector General of Excise in Ireland, and subsequently, after leaving the excise service, an Irish distiller himself. His patent, the Coffey still, was a continuous distillation apparatus which offered an improvement on the traditional pot still. Although similar continuous stills had been proposed in the past, including by other Irish distillers themselves, the Coffey still was the most effective, and soon entered widespread use.

Unlike traditional pot stills, which were operated in a batch manner, Coffey stills could be operated continuously. This made them cheaper to operate, as they required less fuel, and more efficient to run, producing a continuous, rapid output of spirit. In addition, because technically, continuous distillation entails the conduct of a series of distillation runs in sequence internally within a self-contained unit rather than the conduct of a single distillation within a pot still, Coffey stills were capable of producing a far higher strength output than pot stills. However, this advantage also came with a downside. As a consequence of increasing the alcohol concentration in the product, Coffey stills removed some of the other volatile components responsible for flavour. As a result, their use proved extremely controversial when first introduced.

Ireland was the initial testing ground for the Coffey still, with Coffey showcasing them in his own distillery and offering them to other Irish distillers. Although there were seven in operation in Ireland by 1833, their use did not become widespread amongst the larger distilleries. In particular, the big four Dublin distillers, proud of their existing produce, scoffed at its use, questioning if its product, grain whiskey, which they termed neutral or silent (i.e. tasteless) spirit, could even be termed whiskey. It wasn't that the distillers were Luddites, afraid of change; their distilleries were among the most advanced in the world. The distillers were simply steadfast in the belief that their existing methods yielded a superior whiskey. For instance, John Jameson trialled a Coffey still at his distillery, but chose to not adopt the technology because he was not satisfied with the quality of product it produced. Therefore, in the face of opposition in Ireland, Coffey offered his still to the English gin and Scottish whisky distillers, who proved more receptive, and where the technology gained widespread use.

The adoption of the Coffey still in Scotland was indirectly assisted by Ireland's Great Famine of the 1840s, which led to the repealing of the Corn Laws, which between 1815 and 1846 had restricted the import of cheaper foreign grain into Britain and Ireland. After the laws were repealed in 1846, cheap American corn could be imported and used to produce neutral spirit in Coffey stills. This spirit, though lacking in taste, could then be blended with traditional pot still derived spirit to produce a cheaper "blended whiskey". This blended whiskey, which was less intense in taste than pure pot still, was to prove popular in Britain, capturing much market share from Irish pure pot still whiskey.

Despite changing tastes and falling market share, the adoption of Coffey stills was stubbornly resisted by Irish distillers for many years, with some arguing for restrictions on their use. For instance, in 1878, the big Dublin distillers jointly published a pamphlet entitled Truths about Whisky, in which they referred to the output of Coffey stills as "Good, bad or indifferent; but it cannot be whiskey, and it ought not to be sold under that name". In 1904, almost seventy years after the Coffey still had been patented, the Senior Manager of Ireland's largest rural distillery, Allman's of Bandon, placed an outright ban on the introduction of Coffey stills at his distillery, in the face of opposition from a director.

The issue came to a head in 1908, when a royal commission was appointed to investigate the issue. By this point, 60% of all whiskey produced in Britain and Ireland was made in Coffey stills. In 1909, the royal commission settled the argument, declaring that whiskey could refer to the output of either Coffey or pot stills. By comparison, a similar debate occurred in France, such that under French law, Cognac must be double-distilled in pot stills, whereas Coffey stills are permissible in the production of armagnac.

=== An industry in decline ===
In addition to the introduction of blended whiskeys and the Irish distillers' failure to account for its appeal to changing tastes, there were a number of additional issues which placed further pressure on the Irish distillers: the Irish War of Independence, the subsequent civil war, and trade war with Britain (which cut off whiskey exports to Britain and all Commonwealth countries, then Irish whiskey's biggest market); prohibition in the United States (1920–1933), which severely curtailed exports to Irish whiskey's second-biggest market (Irish whiskey had accounted for more than 60% of whiskey sales in the US in the 1800s); widespread counterfeiting of Irish whiskeys in America and Britain; protectionist policies introduced by the Irish Free State government, which significantly capped whiskey exports in the prospect of taxing domestic consumption; and finally, over-expansion and mismanagement at several Irish distilleries. Together, these factors greatly hampered exports and forced many distilleries into economic difficulties and out of business, and by the early 20th century Scotland had surpassed Ireland to become the world's largest whiskey producer.

When British historian Alfred Barnard published his account of the distilleries of Britain and Ireland in 1887, there were 28 distilleries in operation in Ireland. By the 1960s, there were only a handful of these remaining in operation, and in 1966 three of these (John Jameson, Powers, and Cork Distilleries Company) chose to amalgamate their operations under the name of Irish Distillers and to close their existing facilities and concentrate their operations in a new purpose-built facility to be constructed beside the Old Midleton Distillery in County Cork. In 1972, these were joined by the only other remaining Irish operation, Bushmills, so that by the mid-1970s there were only two whiskey distilleries in operation in Ireland, the New Midleton Distillery and the Old Bushmills Distillery, both owned by Irish Distillers, and with only one of these having operated during Irish whiskey's golden years.

Production reached a nadir at about 400,000–500,000 cases per annum during the consolidation period, down from a peak of 12 million cases around 1900.

=== Resurgence ===
The late 1980s saw the beginnings of a long and slow resurgence in the Irish whiskey industry, with the establishment of the Cooley Distillery in 1987 by John Teeling, and then Pernod Ricard's takeover of Irish Distillers in 1988, which led to increased marketing of Irish whiskeys, in particular Jameson, overseas.

Since the 1990s, Irish whiskey has undergone a major resurgence, and for the next twenty years it was the fastest growing spirit in the world, with annual growth of approximately 15–20% per annum. In 2010, the Kilbeggan Distillery, which had closed in 1954, was reopened fully by Teeling. Irish distillers, who operated under rules less strict than those applying to Scottish producers, experimented with new flavours, methods and cocktails.

By June 2019, the number of operating distilleries had grown to 25, and several more were in the planning stages. As of 2017, roughly 750 people were employed on a full-time basis in the whiskey industry in Ireland. In addition, it is estimated that the industry provides support to a further 4,200 jobs across agriculture and other sectors of the economy. As of 2018, sales of Irish whiskey stood at 10.7 million 9-litres cases, up from 4.4 million cases in 2008, with sales projected to exceed 12 million cases (its historical peak) by 2020, and 24 million by 2030. In 2021, annual sales were 14 million cases (168&million bottles), and in 2022, there were 42 distilleries on the island.

== Process ==
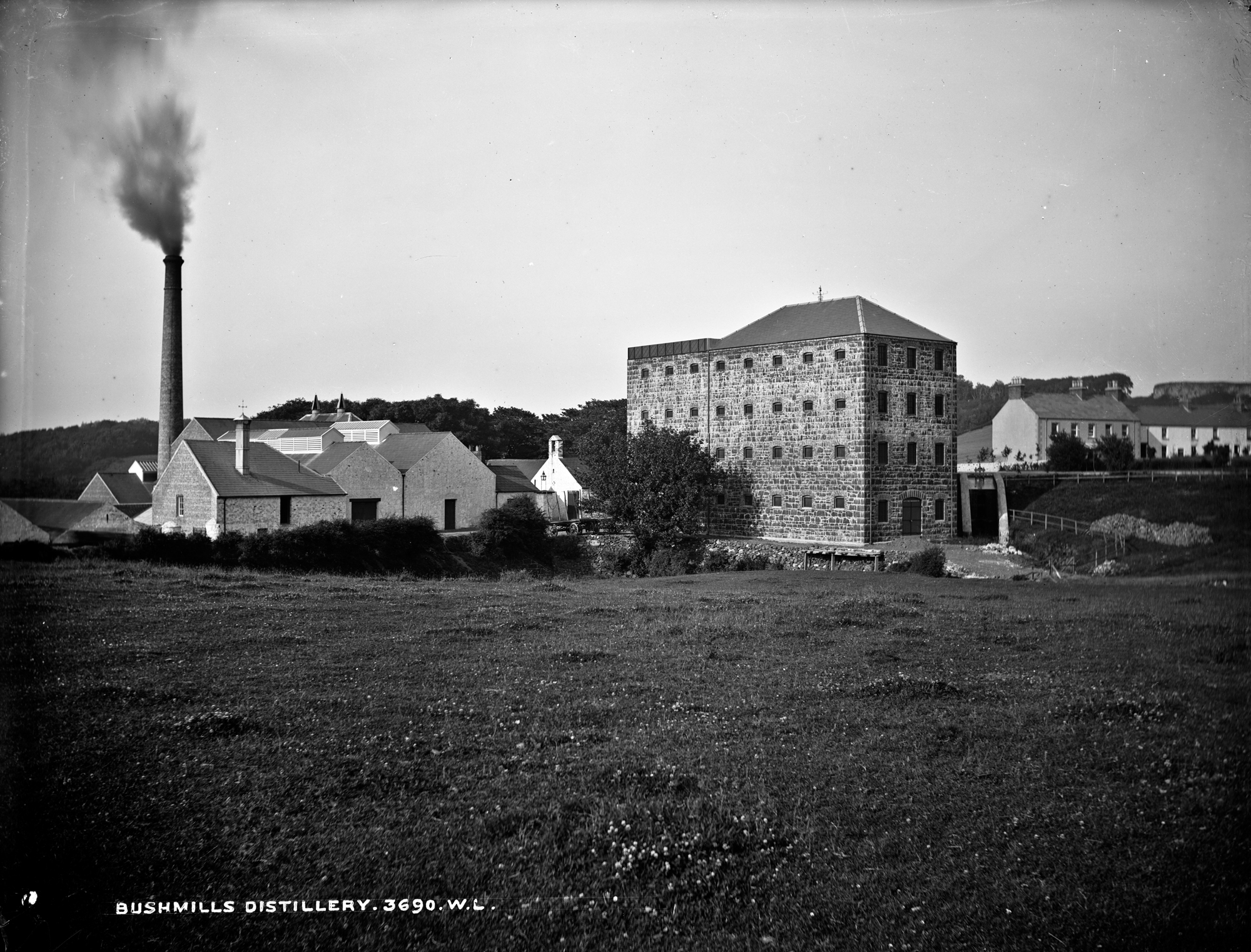
Bushmills Distillery, County Antrim, said to be the world's oldest licensed distillery

Irish whiskey has a smoother finish as opposed to the smoky, earthy overtones common to Scotch whisky, which come largely from drying the malted barley using peat smoke. Peat is rarely used in the malting process outside of Scotland. There are notable exceptions to these rules in both countries. Examples include Connemara peated Irish malt whiskey from the Cooley Distillery in Cooley, County Louth; Pearse Whiskey from Pearse Lyons Distillery in Dublin; and Dunville's peated from Echlinville Distillery. Though not a legal requirement, Irish whiskies are commonly triple distilled. This third distillation heightens lighter, aromatic flavours while removing heavier elements for a smoother spirit.

== Regulations and labelling ==
=== Legal definition ===
Irish whiskey is a protected European Geographical Indication (GI) under Regulation (EC) No 110/2008. As of 29 January 2016, production, labelling and marketing of Irish whiskey must be verified by the Irish revenue authorities as conforming with the Department of Agriculture's 2014 technical file for Irish whiskey.

Key requirements include specifications that Irish whiskey must:

- Be distilled and matured on the island of Ireland (comprising the Republic of Ireland and Northern Ireland) from a mash of malted cereals with or without whole grains of other cereals and which has been:
  - saccharified by the diastase of malt contained therein, with or without other natural enzymes;
  - fermented by the action of yeast;
  - distilled at an alcoholic strength of less than 94.8% alcohol by volume in such a way that the distillate has an aroma and taste derived from the materials used and only plain water and caramel colour is added to it;
  - subject to the maturation of the final distillate for at least three years in wooden casks, such as oak, not exceeding 700 litres (185 US gal; 154 imp gal) capacity
- Retain the colour, aroma and taste derived from the production process referred to above
- Have a minimum alcoholic by volume content of 40%

Individual technical specifications for the three varieties of Irish whiskey, "single pot still", "single malt", "single grain", plus "blended" whiskey (a mix of two or more of these varieties) are also outlined in the technical file. The use of the term "single" in the aforementioned varieties being permissible only if the whiskey is totally distilled on the site of a single distillery.

=== Labelling ===
There are several regulations governing the labelling of Irish whiskeys, in particular:

- Spirit drinks must not be labelled, packaged, sold, advertised or promoted in such a way to suggest they are Irish whiskey or any of the sub-varieties unless they meet the relevant requirements;
- Any age statement must refer to the age of the youngest whiskey used;
- Although traditionally spelled with an 'e', Irish whiskey may also be marketed as "Irish whisky".

== Distilleries in Ireland ==
Distilleries operating in Ireland (as of Mar. 2025)

=== Current distilleries ===
According to the Irish Whiskey Association, as of December 2019, there were 32 whiskey distilleries in operation in Ireland. However, many of these were recently established and had not yet aged their own spirits for sale as whiskey:

- Achill Island Distillery, County Mayo (est. 2015) – produces the Irish American brand whiskey.
- Ballykeefe Distillery, County Kilkenny (est. 2017) – released its own whiskey in March 2021. Also produces vodka, gin and poitín.
- Baoilleach Distillery, County Donegal (est. 2019) – produces gin and poitín, will start production of whiskey in early 2022.
- Blacks of Kinsale, County Cork (est. 2015) – produces whiskey, gin and rum.
- Blackwater Distillery, County Waterford (est. 2014) – produces a range of whiskey and gins.
- Boann Distillery, County Meath (est. 2019)
- Boatyard Distillery, County Fermanagh (est. 2016) – currently produces gin and vodka, whiskey is maturing.
- Burren Whiskey Distillery, County Clare (est. 2019)
- Clonakilty Distillery, County Cork (est. 2016) – opened to the public in March 2019.
- Connacht Whiskey Company, County Mayo (est. 2014) – released its first whiskey in June 2021. Also produces gin, vodka and poitín; and markets a single malt sourced from other distilleries.
- Cooley Distillery, County Louth (est. 1987) – when opened it was the only independent distillery in Ireland. Along with its sister distillery in Kilbeggan, it produces the Connemara, Tyrconnell, Kilbeggan and 2Gingers whiskeys. It has been owned by Suntory Global Spirits since 2011.
- Copeland Distillery, County Down (est. 2019) – currently produces gin, rum and whiskey.
- Crolly Distillery, County Donegal (est. 2020) – produces single malt whiskey, production began in November 2020.
- Dingle Distillery, County Kerry (est. 2012) – distills gin, vodka and whiskey. The first batches of whiskey were released in late 2016. A single pot still whiskey was released in 2017.
- Dublin Liberties Distillery, Dublin (est. 2018) – opened to the public in February 2019.
- Echlinville Distillery, County Down (est. 2013) – the first Northern Irish distillery to be granted a distilling licence in almost 125 years. The distillery relaunched the Dunville's brand, previously produced at the Royal Irish Distillery in Belfast. The distillery also produces gin and poitín.
- Glendalough Distillery, County Wicklow (est. 2013) – it currently ages and finishes whiskeys from other distilleries, and also markets gin and poitín. It is in the process of building a new distillery.
- Glendree Distillery, County Clare (est. 2019) – currently produces vodka, whiskey is maturing.
- Great Northern Distillery, County Louth (est. 2015) – John Teeling, founder of the Cooley distillery developed two distilleries on the site of the Great Northern Brewery in Dundalk. The distilleries began operations in 2015, have a capacity of 50 million bottles per annum.
- Hinch Distillery, County Down (est. 2020) – production began in November 2020.
- Kilbeggan Distillery, County Westmeath (est. 1757, re-commissioned 2007) – the distillery re-opened in 2007, 54 years to the day after it closed, and 250 years after it was first established. A sister distillery of the Cooley Distillery, both were bought by Beam Inc, in 2011.
- Killowen Distillery, County Down (est. 2019) – the distillery will produce double-distilled peated whiskey, single pot still whiskey, and gin.
- Lough Gill Distillery, County Sligo (est. 2019)
- Lough Mask Distillery, County Mayo (est. 2019)
- McConnell's Distillery and Visitor Experience, Crumlin Road Gaol, Belfast - a brand dating from 1776 and now 'reborn'
- Micil Distillery, Galway (est. 2016) – produces poitín and gin
- New Midleton Distillery, County Cork (est. 1975) – produces Jameson, Powers, Paddy, Midleton, Redbreast, and others, including the independently sold Green Spot. Owned by Pernod Ricard since 1988
- Old Bushmills Distillery, County Antrim (est. 1784) – through a 1608 licence to distil, lays claim to be the oldest licensed distillery in the world. Produces a range of blends (Bushmills Original, Black Bush) and single malts (Bushmills 10, 16 and 21 year olds). Previously owned by Pernod Ricard, and Diageo, since 2014 it has been owned by Proximo Spirits.
- Pearse Lyons Distillery, Dublin (est. 2017) – opened in a converted church on Dublin's Thomas Street in September 2017. Alltech previously operated Alltech Craft Distillery in Carlow from 2012 to 2016.
- Powerscourt Distillery, County Wicklow (est. 2018) – located on the grounds of Powerscourt Estate, the distillery will market whiskey previously distilled by its Head Distiller, Noel McSweeney, at the Cooley Distillery, until its own stock is mature enough for release.
- Rademon Estate Distillery, County Down (est. 2015) – the distillery plans to release malt whiskey, its first mature stocks became available in August 2018. The distillery also produces gin.
- Roe & Co Distillery, Dublin (est. 2019) – located in refurbished building which formerly housed the power station of the Guinness Brewery, the distillery sits alongside the site of George Roe's original Thomas Street Distillery. The distillery opened in June 2019, following a €25 million investment by Diageo, owners of the Guinness Brewery.
- Royal Oak Distillery, County Carlow (est. 2016) – previously called Walsh Whiskey Distillery. An Irish-Italian venture, since January 2019 100% owned by Illva Saronno the makers of Tia Maria. The distillery is expected to have a capacity of 500,000 cases per year.
- Shed Distillery, County Leitrim (est. 2014) – production began in December 2014, and the whiskey has been on sale since 2019. The distillery also produces a gin "Gunpowder Gin".
- Slane Distillery, County Meath (est. 2018) – developed and owned by Brown-Forman Corporation, in partnership with Henry and Alex Conyngham, the new distillery was built at the historic Slane Castle estate in the original stable buildings dating back to the early 1700s. Distilling began in early 2018. Slane Irish Whiskey is a blended whiskey aged in a unique triple cask maturation process.
- Sliabh Liag Distillery, County Donegal (est. 2016) – produces whiskey, gin and vodka.
- Tipperary Distillery, County Tipperary (est. 2020) – production of their own distillate began in November 2020 after having bottled sourced spirit since 2016.
- Teeling Distillery, Dublin (est. 2015) – the first new distillery built in Dublin city for over 125 years, it was founded by the Teeling family, who previously established the Cooley Distillery. When the Cooley Distillery was sold in 2011, the Teelings negotiated the purchase of mature stock, which is being used in their whiskeys until mature stock from the new distillery becomes available.
- Tullamore Distillery, County Offaly (est. 2014) – opened in September 2014, returning production of Tullamore D.E.W. to Tullamore after a break of sixty years. The distillery has a capacity of 1.5 million cases per year, and is owned by William Grant & Sons.
- West Cork Distillers, County Cork (est. 2003) – produces single malt, whiskey, whiskey liqueur, vodka, gin and poitín.

=== Planned or under construction ===
Further distilleries are either planned or in development across Ireland. In addition, to the Glendalough distillery mentioned above, which had previously distilled spirit, planned distilleries include:

Name	County
Ballymore Distillers	County Kildare
Belfast Distillery	County Antrim
Cape Clear Distillery	County Cork
Fore Distillery	County Westmeath
Gortinore	County Waterford
Irish Whitetail Distillery	County Louth
Killarney Distillery	County Kerry
Kinnitty Castle Distillery	County Offaly
Lough Neagh Distillery	County Armagh
Lough Ree	County Longford
Matt D'Arcy & Co.	County Down
McAllister Distillery	County Galway
Monasterevin Distillery	County Kildare
Nephin Distillery	County Mayo
Old Carrick Mill	County Monaghan
Scotts Irish Whiskey	County Fermanagh
Skellig Six18	County Kerry
Stewart's Mill Distillery	County Roscommon
Wayward Irish Spirits	County Kerry

In addition, work began on a further distillery, the Quiet Man Craft Distillery, in Derry in 2017. However, the project was subsequently cancelled in late November 2018.

=== Historical distilleries ===
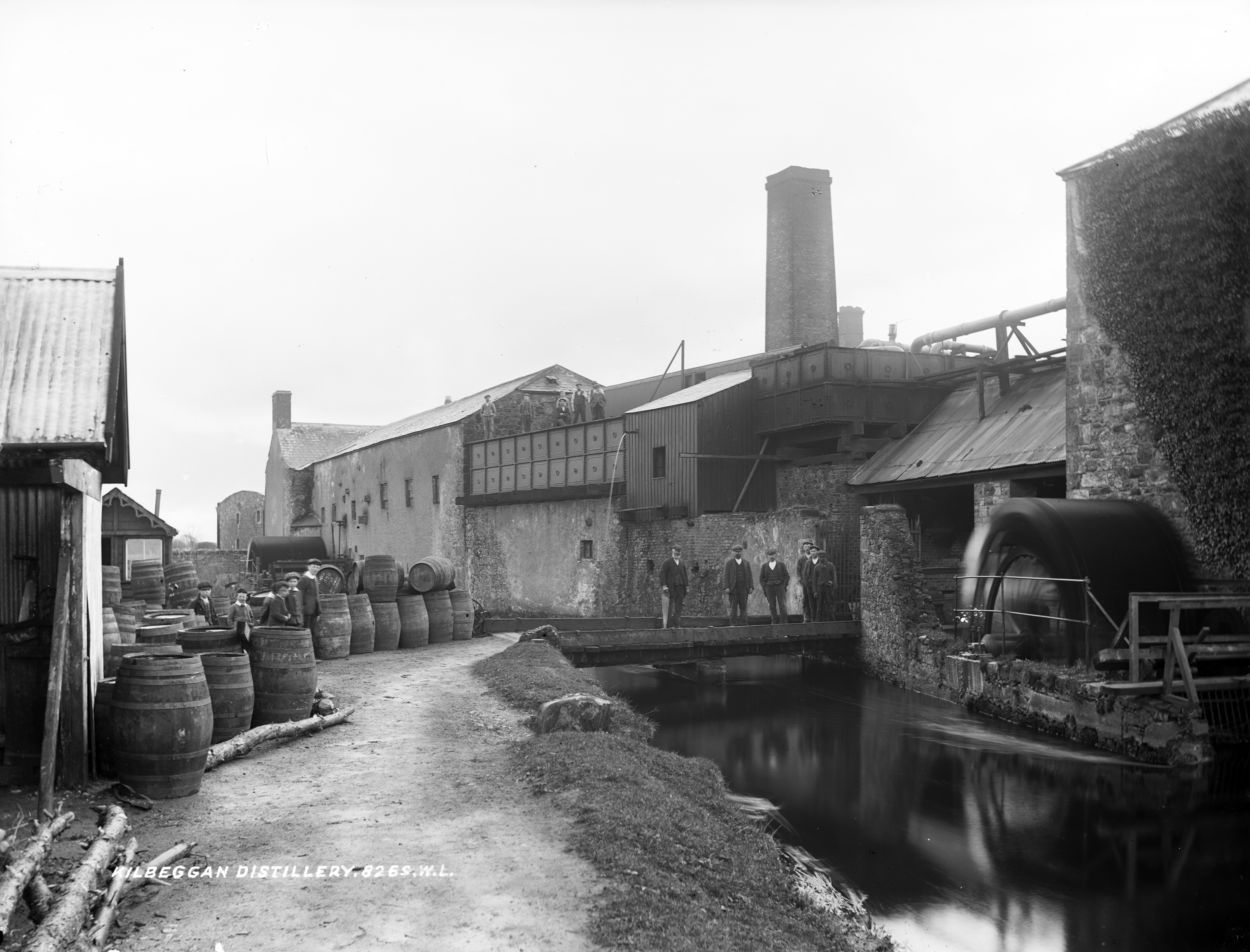
Kilbeggan Distillery, pictured here c. 1905, was just one of many Irish distilleries which closed in the 20th century.

Throughout the 18th and 19th centuries, around 1,000 registered distilleries opened and closed across Ireland – with multiples of this number operating illegally. Most of these have disappeared without a trace, only to be remembered by local street names e.g. Bond Street in Dublin. For instance, the excise return for 1800 lists 40 distilleries operating in Dublin city alone, while Drogheda is estimated to have had 15 distilleries in the 1780s, with as many as ten operating in Cork city in the 19th century. Of these numerous ventures, only one, Bushmills, has remained in continuous operation until the present day. However, the Kilbeggan Distillery (est. 1757) which closed in 1954, reopened in recent years, while a new distillery was constructed in Tullamore to replace an existing distillery which also closed in 1954. Some of the notable distilleries previously in operation across Ireland are listed below.

- Avoniel, Belfast, County Antrim (1882–1929)
- Belfast Distillery, Belfast, County Antrim (1823–1868)
- Cromac Distillery, Belfast, County Antrim (1776–1930)
- Irish Distillery, Connswater, Belfast, County Antrim (1886–1929)
- Royal Irish Distillery, Belfast, County Antrim (1868–1938 or later) – Among Ireland's largest distilleries in the 1890s, the Royal Irish was the home of Dunville's whisky. Although the distillery is now gone, Dunville's was resurrected as an Irish whiskey brand by the Echlinville Distillery in 2013.
- Bandon Distillery, Bandon, County Cork (1826–1929) – At its peak, Allman's distillery in Bandon was the largest rural distillery in Ireland, with an output of over 500,000 gallons per annum.
- Glen Distillery, Kilnap, County Cork (1802–1925)
- Hackett's Distillery, Midleton, County Cork (1824 – c. 1845)
- Old Midleton Distillery, Midleton. County Cork (1825–1975) – Home to the World's largest pot still, the Old Midleton Distillery closed in 1975 when Irish Distillers concentrated production in a new purpose-built facility constructed along the distillery. It now operates as a visitor centre.
- North Mall Distillery, Cork, County Cork (1779–1920)
- Watercourse Distillery, Cork, County Cork (1795–1975)
- Green Distillery, Blackpool, County Cork (1796–1870)
- Daly's Distillery, County Cork (1807–1869)
- Burt Distillery, County Donegal (1814–1841)
- Comber Distilleries, County Down (1825–1953)
- Bow Street Distillery, Dublin (1780–1971) – Run by John Jameson & Son, Bow Street was one of the "big four" Dublin distilleries and the original home of Jameson Irish Whiskey. At its peak Bow Street was the second largest distillery in Ireland and one of the largest in the World, with an output of one million gallons per annum. In the 1970s, production was moved to the New Midleton Distillery, County Cork and the Bow Street Distillery now operates as a visitors' centre.
- Dodder Bank Distilleries, Dublin (1795- c. 1840s)
- John's Lane Distillery, Dublin (1796–1976) – Run by James Power & Son, John's Lane was one of the "big four" Dublin distilleries, and the original home of Power's Irish Whiskey. The distillery had an output of 900,000 gallons per annum in the 1880s. Production was moved to Midleton in the 1970s.
- Jones Road Distillery, Dublin (1873 – c. 1945)
- Marrowbone Lane Distillery, Dublin (late 1700s–1920s) – One of the "big four" Dublin distilleries, Marrowbone Lane was run by William Jameson & Co. (not to be confused with John Jameson & Son above). At its peak Marrowbone Lane had some of the largest capital equipment of any whiskey distillery worldwide.
- Phoenix Park, Chapelizod, Dublin (1878–1921)
- Thomas Street Distillery, Dublin (1757–1926) – Run by the Roe Family, one of the "big four" Dublin Distilling Dynasties, Thomas Street Distillery was once the largest in the Britain and Ireland, with an output of two million gallons per annum at its peak. It was located opposite Guinness' St. James' Gate brewery, which itself was the largest brewery in the world at one point. After the distillery was closed, some of its buildings were purchased and incorporated into the Guinness Brewery. In particular, the landmark St. Patrick's Tower, which dates from 1757 and is one of the oldest smock windmills in Europe, is still visible on the site of the Guinness brewery. In 2017, Diageo announced plans to relaunch the Roe & Co whiskey brand, and to establish a new distillery in an old power plant building at the Guinness Brewery, meters from the site of the original Thomas Street Distillery.
- Burke's Distillery, County Galway (mid-1820s – c. 1850)
- Nun's Island Distillery, County Galway (1846 or earlier–1915)
- Monasterevin, County Kildare (1784 – c. 1921)
- White Horse Distillery, Mountrath, County Laois – named after a local river, this distillery is notable as local folklore suggests that either the distillery or its name were purchased by a Scottish whisky firm in the 1800s. If true, this would mark an interesting turning point in the rise and fall of the whiskey industries in the respective countries.
- Walker's/Thomand Gate, County Limerick (c. 1820 – c. 1905)
- Abbey Street, County Londonderry (c. 1790 – 1925)
- Waterside, County Londonderry (1820–1925)
- Coleraine, County Londonderry (1820–1978)
- Limavady Distillery, County Londonderry (1805–1914)
- Drogheda Distillery, County Louth (1782–1850 or later)
- Dundalk Distillery, County Louth (1708–1926) – one of the oldest distilleries in Ireland, Dundalk Distillery had the distinction of having Ireland's largest chimney.
- Westport Distillery, County Mayo (1826–c.1860)
- Birr Distillery, County Offaly (1805–1889)
- Old Tullamore Distillery, County Offaly (1829–1954) – once one of Ireland's most successful distilleries, Tullamore D.E.W., one of Ireland's most well known whiskeys was originally produced here.
- Marlfield Distillery, Clonmel, County Tipperary (1817–1856)
- Bishop's Water Distillery, Wexford (1827–1915)

== Types ==
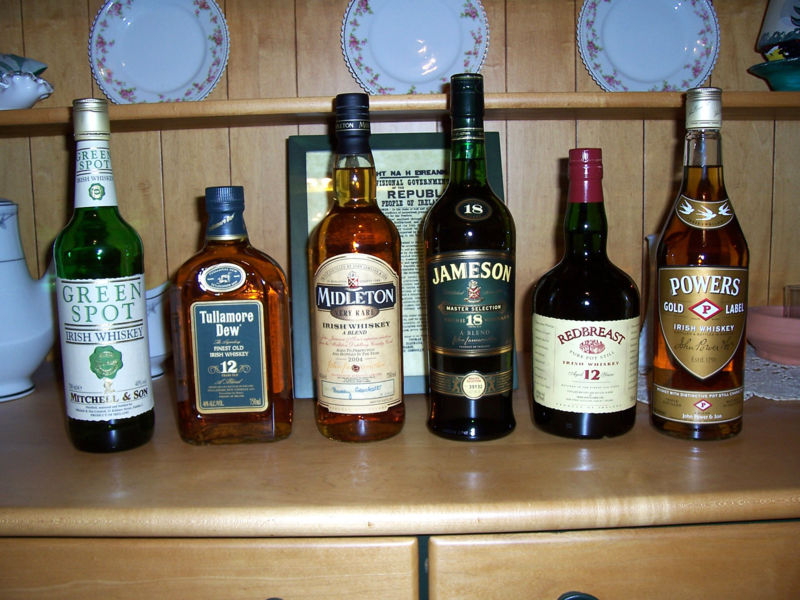
Irish whiskeys

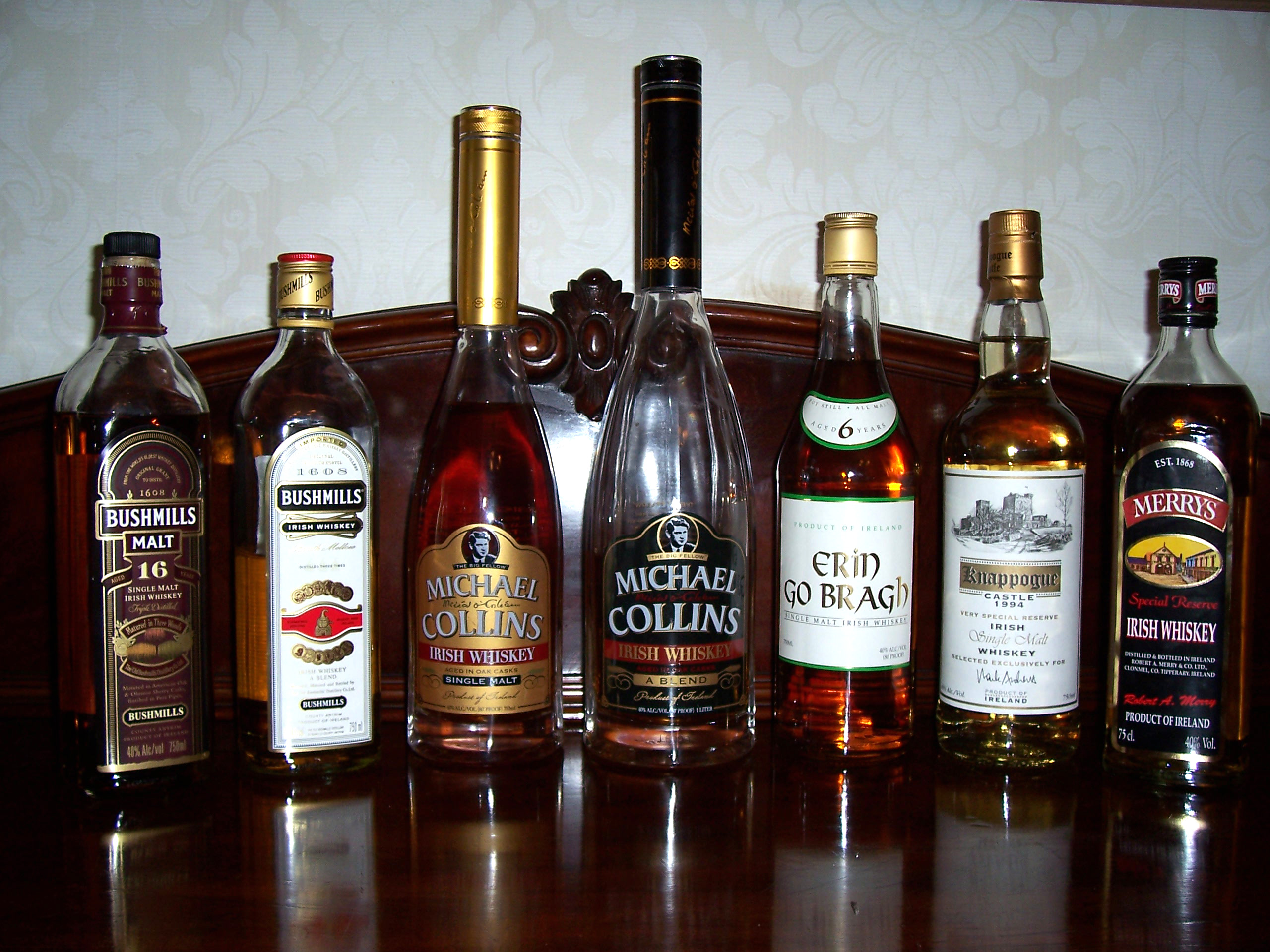
More Irish whiskeys

Irish whiskey comes in several forms, with the name of the style depending on the type of grain used and the distillation process. Traditionally, Irish whiskey was produced in pot stills. Irish whiskeys made in a pot still fall into two categories.

=== Single malt Irish whiskey ===
Whiskeys made entirely from malted barley distilled in a pot still within a single distillery are referred to as single malt whiskeys, a style also very commonly associated with Scotch whisky. These may be double or triple distilled.

=== Single pot still whiskey ===
Single pot still whiskey is made from a mixture of malted and unmalted barley completely distilled in a pot still within a single distillery. This differs from single malt whiskey through the inclusion of raw, unmalted grain in the mash. This style has also historically been referred to as "pure pot still" whiskey and "Irish pot still whiskey", with older bottlings and memorabilia often bearing these names. Single pot whiskeys were the most common style of Irish whiskey until the emergence of blends in the 20th century.

=== Grain whiskey ===
Whiskey produced from continuous distillation in a column or Coffey still, rather than a pot still, is referred to as grain whiskey. This may be produced from a variety of grains. Lighter and more neutral in taste, this spirit is rarely found on its own, though some examples exist. The vast majority of grain whiskey is used to make blended whiskey, a product made by mixing column still product with richer and more intense pot still product.

=== Blended whiskey ===
A mixture of the above styles. Regardless of whether the blended whiskey is made from combining grain whiskey with either single malt whiskey or with single pot still whiskey or both, it is labelled with the same terminology. Blended whiskeys are now the most common style of both Irish and Scotch whiskeys.

=== Examples ===
- Blends: J.J. Corry The Gael, Two Stacks First Cut, Signature Blend, Black Bush, Bushmills Original, Clontarf, Jameson, Kilbeggan, Midleton Very Rare, Paddy, Powers, Tullamore Dew
- Single pot still: Green Spot, Redbreast (12, 15, 21, 27 years)
- Single malt: Bushmills (10, 12, 16, 21 years), Connemara Peated Malt (Regular, Cask Strength and 12 years), Knappogue Castle Irish Whiskey (12, 14, 16 years), Tullamore Dew Single Malt (10 year), Tyrconnell, Killowen Rum & Raisin Single Malt
- Single grain: Kilbeggan Single Grain (8, 10, 15, 18 years), Teeling's Single Grain, Two Stacks Single Grain, Double Barrel.

== See also ==
- Irish Cream (liqueur made from Irish whiskey and cream)
- Irish whiskey brands
- Outline of whisky
