= Watercourse Distillery =

Irish whiskey distillery

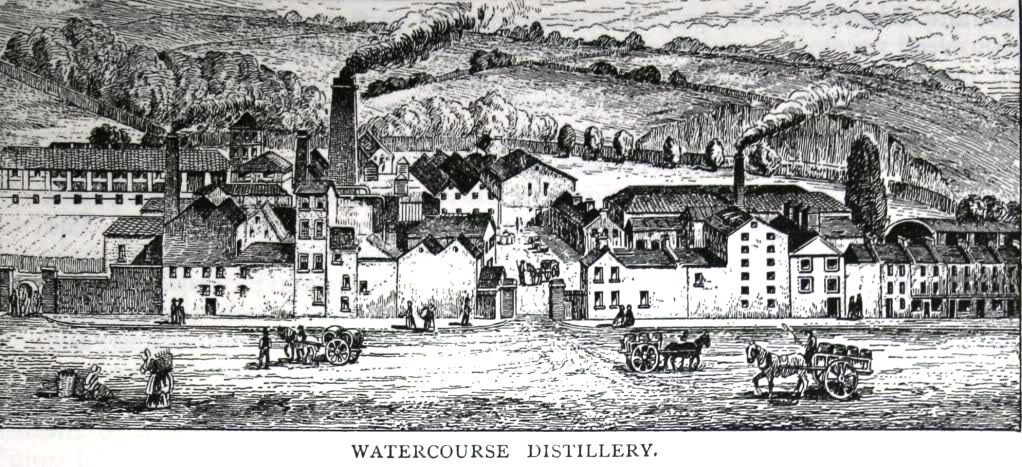
- Watercourse Distillery, Blackpool, Cork, Ireland circa. 1886.
- Location: Cork
- Coordinates: 51.909°N 8.474°W
- Founded: 1795
- Founder: Thomas Hewitt; John Teulon; Richard Blunt
- Status: Defunct
- Water source: Kiln river
- No. of stills: Initially 2 pot stills (1,168 and 544 gallons), later a Coffey Still was added.
- Mothballed: 1870s
- Demolished: Mid-1990s

The Watercourse Distillery was an Irish whiskey distillery which was established in Cork City, Ireland in 1795.

In 1867, the distillery was purchased by the Cork Distilleries Company (CDC), in an amalgamation of five Cork distilleries. Following the amalgamation, the distillery was mothballed for a period at the beginning of the 20th century. However, operations at the distillery were later resumed, with production of yeast, industrial alcohol and grain alcohol occurring at the distillery until the 1970s. Distillation ceased at the facility in 1975, when Irish Distillers, who at that stage owned the Watercourse along with several other distilleries in the Republic of Ireland consolidated its operations in a new, purpose-built distillery in Midleton.

The name of the distillery lives on in the name given by Irish Distillers to a subsidiary which runs the Jameson Experience at the former Jameson Bow Street Distillery in Dublin and the Old Midleton Distillery in Cork.

The Watercourse Distillery was where Cork Dry Gin, the most popular brand of gin in Ireland was originally produced. In the 1960s, Cork Distilleries Company launched a whiskey, called Hewitt's, which paid homage to the Watercourse's original owners. Unusually for an Irish whiskey, Hewitt's was a peated blend. However, this was later reformulated as an unpeated blend, before being discontinued in the 2004.

== History ==
In 1792, a partnership was established by two local butter Merchants, Thomas Hewitt and John Teulon, and London distiller Richard Blunt, which resulted in the construction of the Watercourse Distillery, between 1793 and 1794 on Watercourse Road, Blackpool, Cork. The distillery and the road on which it was located were named for their proximity to the Kiln river, a tributary of the River Lee which flows through Cork City. In 1799, Hewitt, Teulon and Blunt were joined by James Morrogh, as an equal partner in the firm, each having invested.

By 1834, the other partners having left, the Hewitt's were left as the sole owners of the company, which by that stage traded under the name Hewitt & Co.

In 1867, the distillery was purchased by the Cork Distilleries Company (CDC), in an amalgamation of five Cork distilleries. Due to declining whiskey sales, Cork Distilleries Company ceased distilling operations at the Watercourse in the 1880s, though the distillery continued to be used as a grain and malt store, malting facility and bonded warehouse. When Alfred Barnard, the British historian visited the distillery in the 1880s, he stated that over 6,000 barrels of casks of whiskey were maturing at the premises.

Circa 1913, CDC began installing equipment for the production of yeast and industrial spirit at the distillery, with production beginning in 1916. The yeast produced at the distillery was marketed under the name "Terrier" by a separate company called the Cork Yeast Company (CYC), displacing imports from Holland; while the industrial alcohol, produced using a Coffey Still, was exported for use in explosives, demand for industrial alcohol in the United Kingdom having grown eight-fold during World War I.

Subsequently, traditional distilling operations regained importance, with samples of grain whiskey produced at the Watercourse distillery during this period (1951), recently selling at auction for €1,450. In 1954, the company was renamed as the Watercourse Distillery Ltd.

In 1966, the Cork Distilleries Company merged with two of the other remaining Irish distilleries, John Jameson & Son and John Powers & Son to establish Irish Distillers. Following the merger, Irish Distillers chose close their existing distilleries, and amalgamate their operations at a new, purpose-built distillery in Midleton, County Cork, with activity at the Watercouse Distillery coming to a halt soon after.

Having lain derelict for some years, much of the distillery was demolished in the mid-1990s during construction of the North Link Road. However, a former bonded warehouse built circa 1800, still stands on the site of the distillery.
