= North Mall Distillery =

Defunct distillery

Coordinates: 51°53′58.0″N 8°29′08.8″W

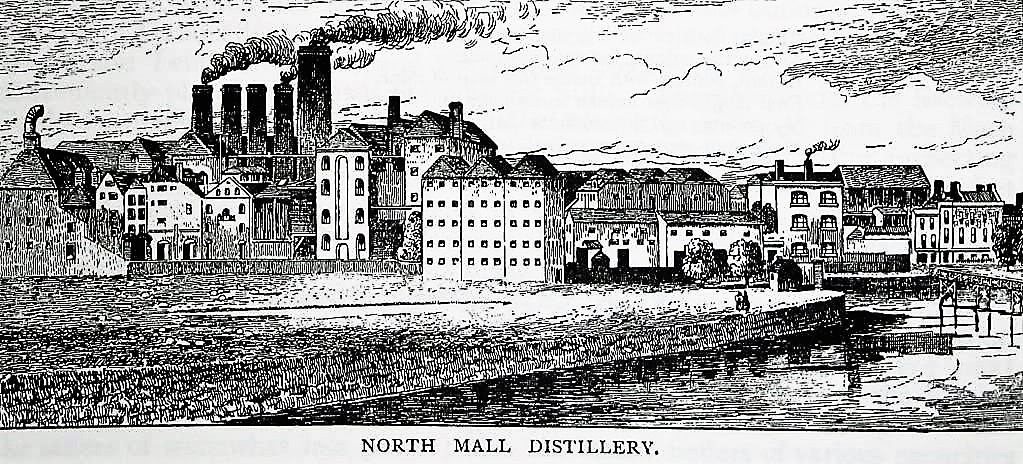
- The North Mall Distillery, circa 1886
- Industry: Distilled beverage
- Founded: 1779
- Defunct: 1920
- Fate: Defunct
- Successor: Cork Distillers Company, Irish Distillers
- Headquarters: Cork, Ireland
- Key people: Thomas and Francis Wise
- Products: Irish whiskey
- Brands: Wise Whiskey, Wise's Cork Old Pot Still Whiskey
- Number of employees: 250

The North Mall Distillery was an Irish whiskey distillery located in Cork City, Ireland. In its day one of the most famous distilleries in Ireland, the distillery was destroyed by a fire in 1920. Distilling operations never resumed at the North Mall after the fire, and it was later converted into a bottling and storage facility which was used by Irish Distillers until 2007, at which point operations were transferred to Irish Distillers' other bottling facilities in Dublin. In the mid-2000s, much of the site was jointly acquired by University College Cork and Mercy University Hospital, and has since been redeveloped.

== History ==
The exact origin of the distillery is uncertain, however, it is said to have been established in 1779 by two brothers, Thomas and Francis Wise. The distillery was located on the north banks of the River Lee, on the site of an old Dominican Friary known as the Abbey of St. Francis or the North Abbey. After its establishment, the distillery expanded rapidly, in particular, after the reform of the Distillation Act in 1823. In 1827, production was reported as just over 320,000 gallons, up from 312,000 gallons in 1821, and by 1833, had rise to some 400,000 gallons per annum.

In 1867, Francis Wise, a nephew and son of the aforementioned founders, sold the distillery to the Cork Distillers Company (CDC) which began as an amalgamation of four Cork distilleries: the North Mall, and three others: Daly's, the Green, and the Watercourse. A year later, in 1868, Murphy's Midleton Distillery also joined the CDC, bringing five Cork distilleries under common ownership.

In the years following the amalgamation, the North Mall proved to be one of CDC's more promising concerns. When Alfred Barnard, the British historian visited the North Mall in 1886, the distillery occupied 23 acres, and had a staff of 250 people, and an output of 500,000 gallons per annum. The distillery, Barnard reported, was amongst the cleanest, and best-kept of all those he had visited in Britain and Ireland, and marketed a whiskey known as Wise's Cork Old Pot Still Whiskey in Ireland, England, "the Colonies" and America. By contrast, some of CDC's other distilleries were less fortunate. Daly's shut in 1869, shortly after its takeover by CDC, while distillation of whiskey likely ceased at the Green in 1870, although it may later produced gin for a period in the 20th century. In the mid-1880s, the Watercourse Distillery was mothballed, so that by the turn of the century, only two of CDC's five distilleries, North Mall and Midleton remained in production.

Unfortunately, in 1920 a fire broke out at the North Mall distillery, completely destroying its five-storey mill, and causing significant damage to most, if not all of the production buildings. Had the Irish whiskey industry not been in the midst of a crisis, with most distilleries enduring severe financial hardship, the distillery might have been rebuilt. However, facing an uncertain economic outlook, a decision was taken to concentrate production at Midleton, rather than to renovate the North Mall Distillery. Subsequently, the buildings which were most badly damaged were demolished, and those that survived the fire converted to storage facilities. In 1964, a modern, state of the art bottling facility was added to the site of the distillery by Cork Architect Frank Murphy (architect).

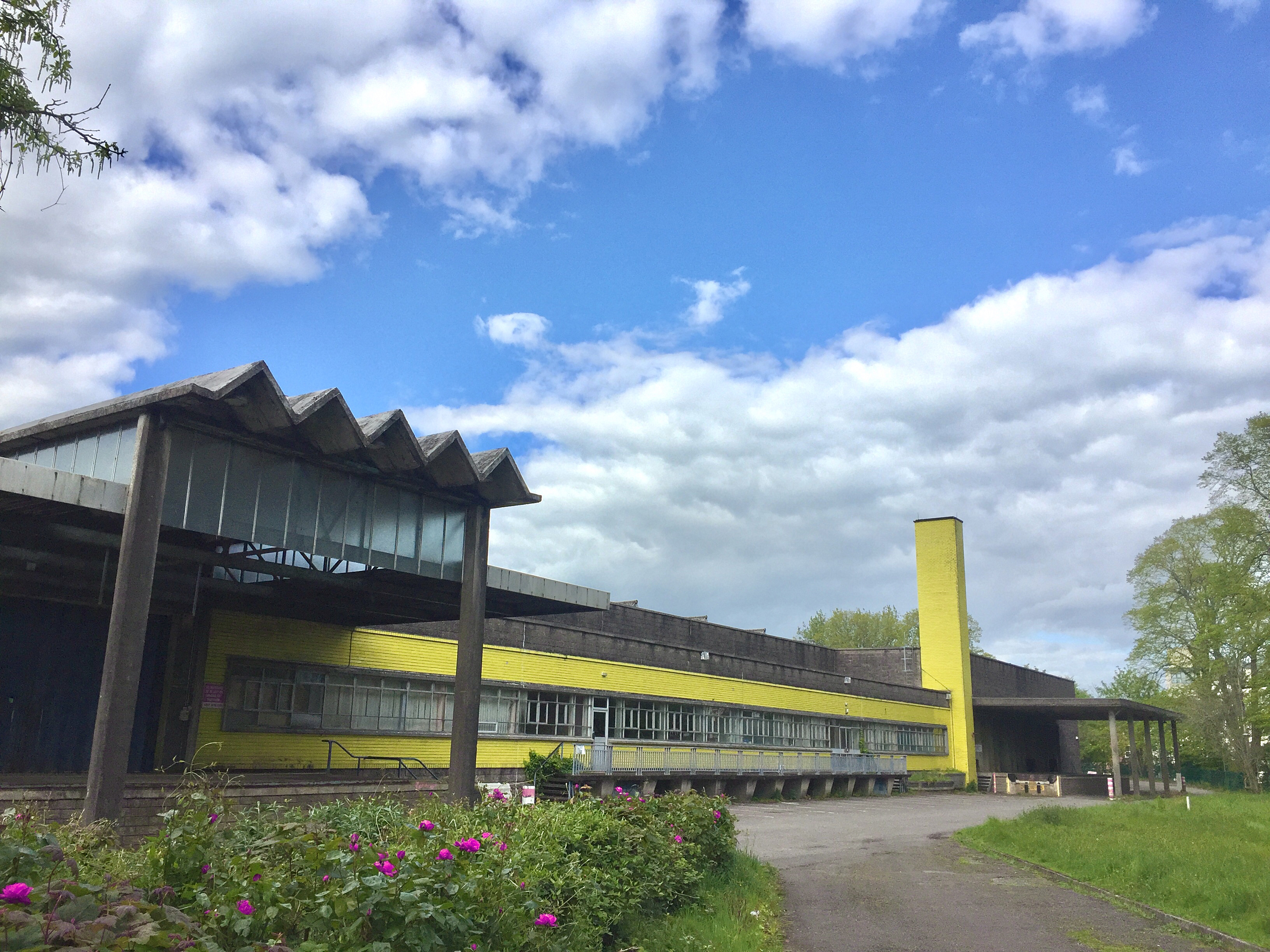
Cork Distillers Bottling plant, 1964

In 1966, with the Irish distilleries still facing an uncertain future, CDC merged with two of the other remaining Dublin distilleries, John Jameson & Co. and John Powers & Co., to form Irish Distillers. Under Irish Distillers, the North Mall continued to be used as a bottling and packaging facility until mid-2007, when it was closed. Irish Distillers cited falling domestic sales of whiskey and gin following excise tax hikes, and the loss of the Tullamore Dew bottling contract as factors contributing to its closure.

Much of the site was subsequently redeveloped and incorporated into University College Cork and the Mercy University Hospital. However, some remnants of the original distillery remain. A brick chimney stack built by CDC for the sum of £5,000 between 1877–1888, originally with an elevation of 160 feet, but now somewhat reduced in height, remains as a protected structure. In addition, a residence of the distillery's former owner, Francis Wise, also a protected building, is now part of University College Cork's North Mall / Distillery Fields Campus. The building, known as Distillery House, is situated at the junction of North Mall and Wise's Hill, one of a handful of local place names tracing their origin to the distillery's former owners.

== See also ==
- Irish whiskey brands

== Bibliography ==
- Townsend, Brian (1999). The Lost Distilleries of Ireland. Glasgow: Angels' Share (Neil Wilson Publishing). ISBN 1897784872.
