= Birr Distillery =

Distillery in Ireland

Coordinates: 53.096°N 7.905°W

- Location: County Offaly
- Owner: N/A
- Founded: 1805
- Founder: R.&J. Wallace
- Status: N/A
- Mothballed: 1889

Birr Distillery was an Irish whiskey distillery built in 1805 in County Offaly (previously known as King's County) in Ireland.

The distillery was located close to Newbridge Street on the River Cam-Cor (meaning ‘crooked weir’). The three storey, quadrangular distillery was a substantial distillery at one stage with an annual output of 200,000 US gal (760,000 L; 170,000 imp gal), but not much is known about it today.

== History ==
There were five distilleries in County Offaly, but by 1818 there were only two in operation which were both located at Birr. In the late 1840s, one of the distilleries closed, and the other was purchased by the Wallace Brothers who are only known by their initials R and J. Birr Distillery consisted of a malting floor, kiln and mill, mash tun, still room, spirit store and bonded warehouse.

The Wallace brothers kept Birr Distillery in business up to 1889 until a fire broke out and put an end to the distillery. A worker fell asleep and the friction caused by the millstone ignited the surrounds. As the fire spread, casks exploded and there are reports that state "the whiskey flowed in a flaming mass down the Camcor River, turning it into a great swirling and flaming Christmas pudding."

In the 1990s, it was bought by an English family who converted it to a summer house, while the other buildings across the river were converted into apartments.

== See also ==
- Irish Whiskey
- Historical distilleries
