= Bishop's Water Distillery =

- Location: Wexford
- Coordinates: 52°19′50.2″N 6°27′54.3″W
- Founded: 1827
- Founder: John Devereux; Nicholas Devereux; Richard Devereux; Maurice Harvey; Patrick Breen
- Status: Defunct
- Water source: Bishop's Water Stream
- No. of stills: 3 pot stills (9,000, 11,000, 18,000 gallons)
- Capacity: 250,000 gallons per annum (1909)

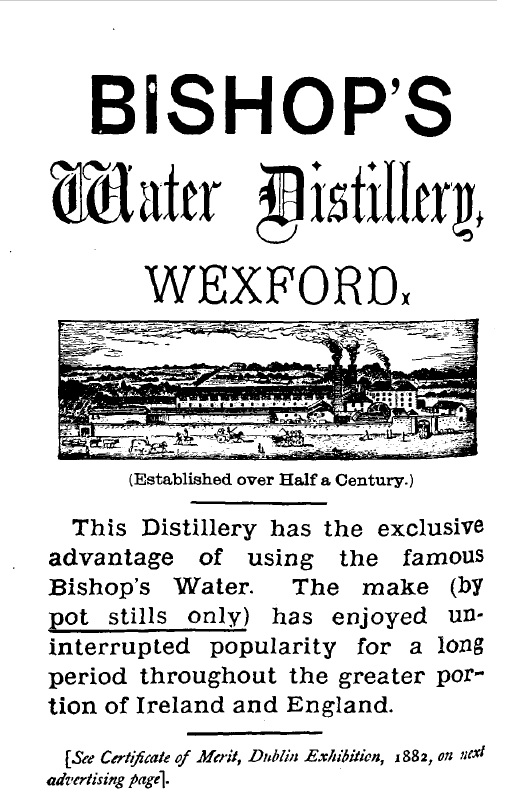
An 1885 advert for Bishop's Water Distillery

Bishop's Water Distillery was an Irish whiskey distillery which operated in Wexford, Ireland between 1827 and 1914. The distillery was named for a stream which ran along the back of the distillery, the Bishop's Water, said to possess "various occult properties derived from the blessings of the sainted Bishop of Ferns".

Constructed at a cost of £30,000, the distillery was reported to be “reckoned the most perfect and complete of the kind in Ireland”. In 1833, just a few years after it opened, the distillery recorded an output of about 200,000 gallons per annum . However, output had fallen to just 110,000 gallons per annum in 1886, when the distillery was visited by Alfred Barnard, as recorded in his seminal 1887 publication "The Whisky Distilleries of the United Kingdom". This was amongst the lowest output of any distillery operating in Ireland at the time, and far below the potential output of 250,000 gallons per annum reported when the distillery was offered for sale as a going concern in 1909. The distillery's whiskey, Barnard noted, was highly appreciated locally, and in the British cities where it was exported.

In the early 20th century, with the Irish whiskey industry in decline, Bishop's Water distillery, like the majority of distilleries in Ireland at the time, suffered serious financial difficulties, and entered bankruptcy. Following its closure, the distillery was initially converted into an iron works (Pierce Ironworks). However, much of the site was later demolished, and little evidence of the distillery still remains. Some mementos can still be found in locals pubs, while a stone archway known to have been extant in 1903 and now bearing the inscription "Casa Rio", possibly in reference to the location of a Pierce ironworks office in Buenos Aires, marks the entrance to the site where the distillery once stood, on Distillery Road.

== History ==
An 1830 newspaper article reporting on the accidental death at the distillery

In 1827, a whiskey distillery was established on what is now Distillery Road, Wexford by a consortium of businessmen. The consortium which traded under "Devereux, Harvey, and Co., Distillers", comprised a number of local businessmen, including Nicholas Devereux, his father John Devereux, and Maurice Crosbie Harvey. John Devereux had previously operated a small distillery in the area in the late 1700s, but will little success. In 1830, one of the partners, Maurice Harvey, was accidentally killed at the distillery by an excise man who was taking aim at some birds flying overhead. A few years later, in 1836, the partnership was dissolved at the mutual consent of the remaining partners, with Nicholas Devereux taking sole ownership of the distillery, after which the distillery traded under the name Nicholas Devereux & Son. On his death in 1840, operation of the distillery was taken over by his son Richard. Nicholas Devereux's daughter, Mary Anne Therese was also deeply involving in the distilling industry. She married John Locke, founder of the larger Kilbeggan distillery, and successfully took over the business operations of the distillery on his death in 1868.

According to Alfred Barnard, the British journalist who visited Bishop's Water in the 1880s, the distillery produced triple-distilled "old pot still whiskey", which was sold locally in Ireland, and also exported to London, Liverpool, and Bristol. At the time of his visit, the Malt Warehouses on-site contained over 16,000 barrels of pure malt. In addition, upwards of 3,000 casks of whiskey were undergoing maturation at the distillery. Whiskey from the distillery is also noted to have been used in the production of blended whiskeys in later years.

In the early 20th century, the distillery suffered financial difficulties. In 1907, an attempt was made to appoint a receiver, and in 1909, the distillery was put up for sale, but no takers could be found. In 1914, distilling eventually ceased at the site, and the remaining stocks were sold off.
