= Mary Anne Locke =

Irish distiller and philanthropist

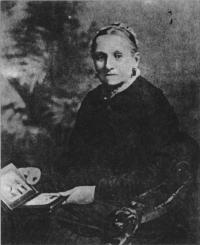
- Locke in 1879
- Born: Mary Anne Theresa Devereux; 24 September 1831; Wexford, County Wexford, Ireland
- Died: 1889 (aged 57–58); Ardnaglue House, County Westmeath

Mary Anne Locke (24 September 1831 – 1889) was an Irish distiller and philanthropist.

== Life ==
Mary Anne Locke was born Mary Anne Theresa Devereux in Wexford on 24 September 1831. Her father was Nicholas Devereux, proprietor of Bishop's Water Distillery, Wexford. She was the niece of John Thomas Devereux and Richard Joseph Devereux. In 1850, she married John Locke, the owner of Locke's Distillery, and lived in Brusna House beside the distillery. The couple had three sons, the eldest of whom died in infancy, they also had a daughter who died as an infant.

After the death of her husband, Locke took over the running of the distillery from 1868 to around 1880. She added a retail spirit store to the site in 1868 beside Brusna House. During her time in charge, the distillery doubled its throughput, and there was continued investment in machinery and buildings. By extending the distilling season and doubling the number of distilling periods each season, Locke increased the cost efficiency of the business, with output rising to 78,000 gallons by 1875. Locke retired around 1880 when her eldest son, John Edward Locke, was old enough to run the business. Aided by her father, Locke helped to finance the establishment of a Convent of Mercy in Kilbeggan in 1879. She provided the land and £1,000 for the construction, later endowing a further £6,000. Locke had moved from Brusna House to Ardnaglue House near Kilbeggan after she was widowed. She died there in 1889.
