= Green Distillery =

Irish whiskey distillery

- Location: Cork
- Coordinates: 51°54′42.6″N 8°28′23.5″W
- Founded: 1796
- Founder: Robert Allan and Denis Corcoran
- Status: Defunct
- Mothballed: 1870s

The Green Distillery was an Irish whiskey distillery which was established in Cork City, Ireland in 1796. In 1867, the distillery was purchased by the Cork Distilleries Company (CDC), in an amalgamation of five Cork distilleries. Production of whiskey at the distillery likely ceased soon afters its acquisition by the CDC. However, the distillery is known to have remained in use a bonded store by the Cork Distilleries Company for several years thereafter. In the mid-twentieth century, the distillery resumed operations as a gin distillery for a period of time, however, it has since been almost completely demolished.

The distillery was notable for its use of an early continuous distillation apparatus, invented by the distillery's then co-owner, Joseph Shee.

== History ==
The distillery began life on 12 May 1796, when two distillers, Robert Allan and Denis Corcoran purchased a dwelling house and maltings on North York Street (now Thomas Davis Street) from Bartholomew Foley, a draper. The malthouse had formerly been owned by Thomas Wood, a maltster, in 1780. In 1802, the Allan and Corcoran are recorded as working a 762 gallon still. In the years that followed, the distillery seems to have changed hands several times. Around 1812, the business was being run by two brothers, Thomas and Joseph Shee, Benjamin Hodges, and some others. Thomas Shee acted as the distiller working a 201 gallon still, while Joseph acted a marketing agent based in London. Hodges and the others may have been silent partners who provided capital but nothing else, as their connection with the distillery soon disappeared. Output was recorded at 100,000 gallons in 1828. In June 1830, the Shees entered financial difficulties, and ownership passed to Joseph Shee. Joseph continued operations using capital provided by James Kiernan under a mortgage, while Thomas Shee remained on as a distiller. In 1833, excise records show that the distillery paid a duty charge of £26,716, which equated to about 160,000 gallons proof. By 1835, Kiernan took outright control of the distillery. When Kiernan died in December 1844, his will specified that the distillery should be put up for sale. It was purchased on 27 July 1845 by George Waters, who was previously a co-owner of Daly's Distillery on John Street, until the dissolution of the partnership following the death of one of the partners.

Waters ran the distillery until his retirement around 1867, after which the distillery was purchased by the Cork Distilleries Company (CDC), in an amalgamation of five Cork distilleries. Under CDC, distilling ceased at the distillery in the 1880s, with production transferred to their nearby North Mall distillery. Subsequently, the Green Distillery was used as a bonded store for some time. However, in the mid-twentieth century, new equipment was installed in the Green Distillery, with production of gin occurring there for a period of time.

According to Irish Distillers, who absorbed the Cork Distilleries Company in the 1960s, a warehouse on the site was used to store whiskey in bond until the 1980s. Since then, the distillery has been almost completely demolished, with only a small archway remaining. However, one of original pot stills is still in use, currently employed as an experimental still at the nearby New Midleton Distillery.

== Notability ==
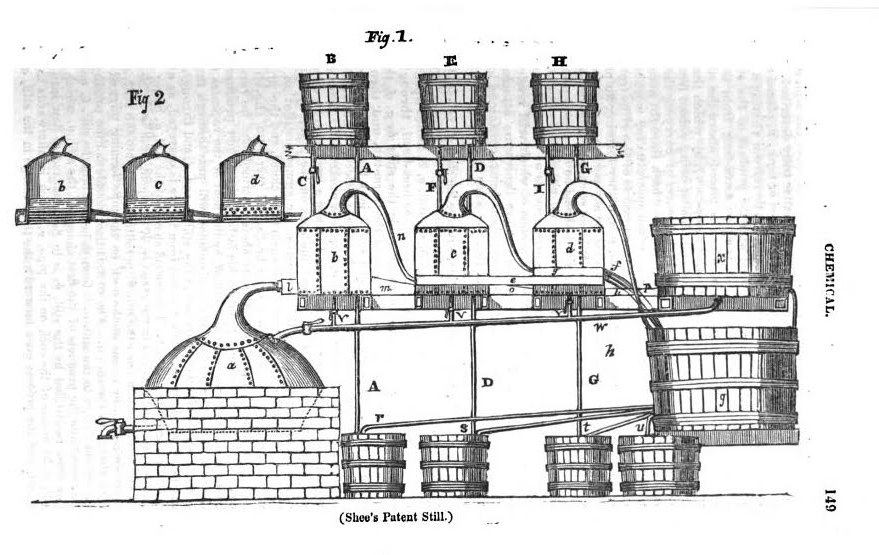
A sketch of Shee's Patent Still

The distillery was home to an early continuous distillation apparatus, which was installed and used at the distillery for almost twenty years. The apparatus, which the distiller's co-owner, Joseph Shee, patented in 1834, was similar to Jean‐Édouard Adam's 1801 design, and consisted of four pot stills connected in series. Though thought to have been effective, the apparatus was not widely adopted. In particular, a more efficient apparatus, the Coffey Still, was patented by another Irish distiller, Aeneas Coffey, in 1830.

== See also ==
- List of historic whisky distilleries

=== Bibliography ===
- McGuire, Edward B. (1973). Irish Whiskey: A History of Distilling, the Spirit Trade and Excise Controls in Ireland. Dublin: Gill and MacMillan. pp. 376–377. ISBN 0717106047.
- Townsend, Brian (1997–1999). The Lost Distilleries of Ireland. Glasgow: Angels' Share (Neil Wilson Publishing). ISBN 1897784872.
