= Daly's Distillery =

Former distillery in Cork, Ireland

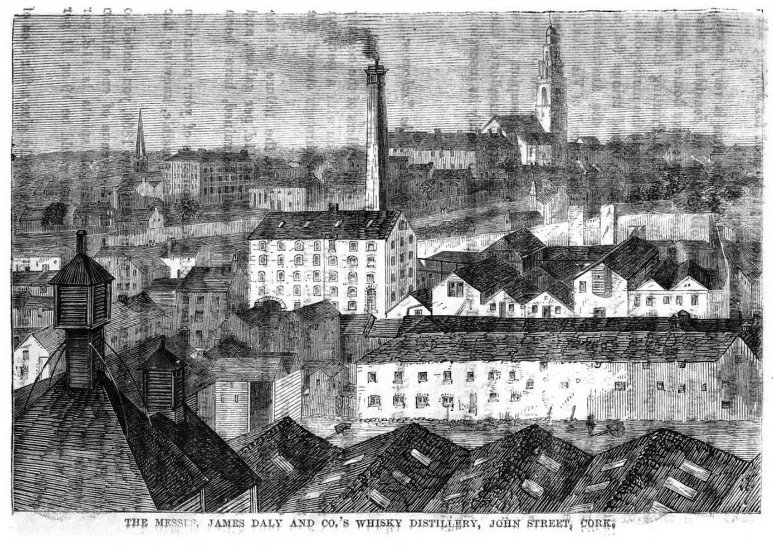
- Location: Cork
- Coordinates: 51°54′12.4″N 8°28′24.5″W
- Owner: James Daly & Co. (later Cork Distilleries Company)
- Founded: 1820
- Founder: James Daly
- Status: Defunct
- Mothballed: 1869

Daly's Distillery was an Irish whiskey distillery which operated in Cork City, Ireland from around 1820 to 1869. In 1867, the distillery was purchased by the Cork Distilleries Company (CDC), in an amalgamation of five cork distilleries. Two years later, in 1869, as the smallest CDC distillery, Daly's Distillery ceased operations. In the years that followed its closure, some of the buildings became part of Shaw's Flour Mill, and Murphy's Brewery, with others continuing to be used as warehouses by Cork Distilleries Company for several years (though information is difficult to come by, their continued existence is mentioned in Alfred Barnard's 1887 account of the distilleries of the United Kingdom).

== History ==
In 1798, the firm of James Daly & Co. was established as a rectifying distillery and wine merchants at a premises on Blarney Street, Cork. In 1820, this was relocated to 32 John Street. As some sources state that the John distillery was established in 1807, and it is known that a William Lyons ran a distillery on John Street in the early 1800s, it is possible that Daly purchased an existing distillery on John Street.

In 1822, James Daly's nephew John Murray joined the partnership. In 1828, the distillery is reported to have an output of 87,874 gallons of spirit. However, in 1833, output of only 39,000 gallons per annum was reported, which was low compared with some of the Irish distillers of the era; for instance, at that time Murphy's Distillery in nearby Midleton, had an output of over 400,000 gallons per annum.

On James Daly's death, in 1850, the partnership, which at that point had consisted of James Daly, Maurice Murray (John Murray's son) and George Waters, was dissolved, with Maurice Murray taking sole ownership of the distillery, which continued to trade as James Daly & Co. After leaving the partnership, George Waters went on to purchase and run the nearby Green distillery.

In 1853, Murray rebuilt and significantly extended the distillery, expanding onto neighbouring streets. By the late 1860s, the distillery had grown to occupy 3 acres, consisting of a brewhouse, distillery and maltings on John Street; granaries on Leitrim Street; and eight bonded warehouses scattered across John Street, Leitrim Street and Watercourse Road. According to accounts from the time, whiskey from the distillery, some of which was aged for seven years or more, was mainly exported "to the colonies". In particular, it was said that in Australia the whiskey sold at a premium to other whiskeys.

A well respected member of the Irish distilling industry at the time, the distillery's owner Maurice Murray, conducted significant correspondence with William Ewart Gladstone, the then British Chancellor of the Exchequer, on behalf of the Irish distillers, with regard to the duties placed on Irish whiskey.

In 1867, Daly's Distillery, was absorbed into Cork Distilleries Company (CDC), in an amalgamation of five Cork distilleries. As the smallest of the five distilleries, Daly's closed soon after the amalgamation, in 1869. Following its closure, Maurice Murray is known to have continued to work for the CDC at the North Mall Distillery, along with his son Daly Murray.

The main distillery buildings later became part of Shaw's Flour Mill, while other buildings were incorporated into the nearby Murphy's Brewery, which was run by relatives of James Murphy of the Midleton Distillery, who was the driving force behind the establishment of the Cork Distilleries Company. One of the distillery buildings, now named "the Mill", is still visible on 32 Lower John Street, Cork.

== Bibliography ==
Measom, George S. (1870). The Official Illustrated Guide to the Great Southern & Western Railway. London: C. Griffin & Company.
