= Powers (whiskey) =

Brand of Irish Whiskey

Powers Irish Whiskey
- Type: Irish whiskey
- Manufacturer: Irish Distillers (Pernod Ricard)
- Origin: Ireland
- Introduced: 1791
- Alcohol by volume: 40%-46%
- Variants: Powers 12 year old reserve, Powers Three Swallow, Powers Signature Release, Powers John's Lane Release, Powers Irish Rye
- Related products: Paddy, Jameson

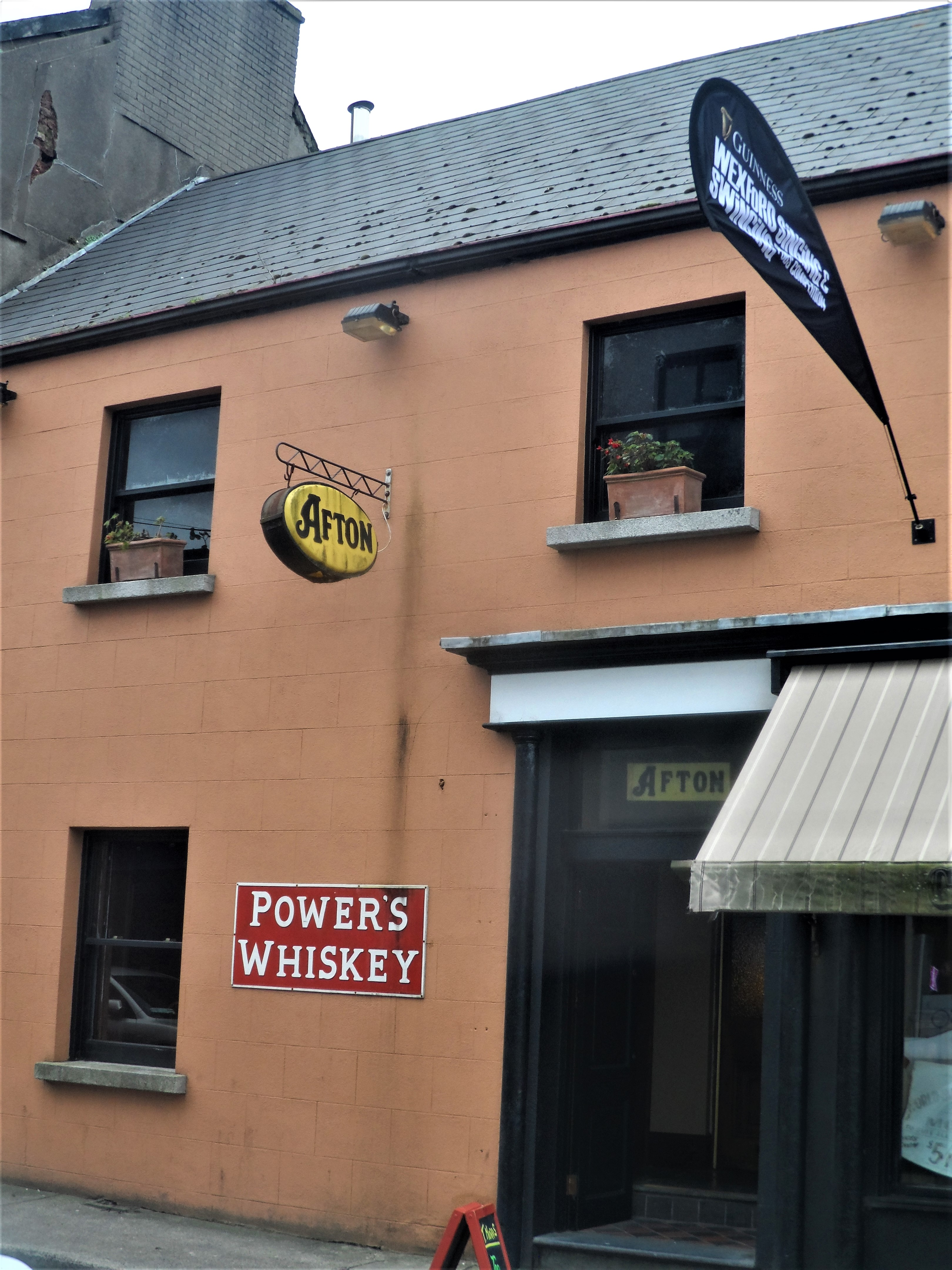
Power's Whiskey advertisement on a pub in Wexford

Powers is a brand of Irish whiskey produced by the Irish Distillers subsidiary of Pernod Ricard. Historically a single pot still whiskey, the flagship Powers Gold Label brand was the first Irish whiskey ever to be bottled. Powers Gold Label was the best-selling whiskey in Ireland.

In recent years, several single pot still variants have been relaunched under the Powers label.

== History ==
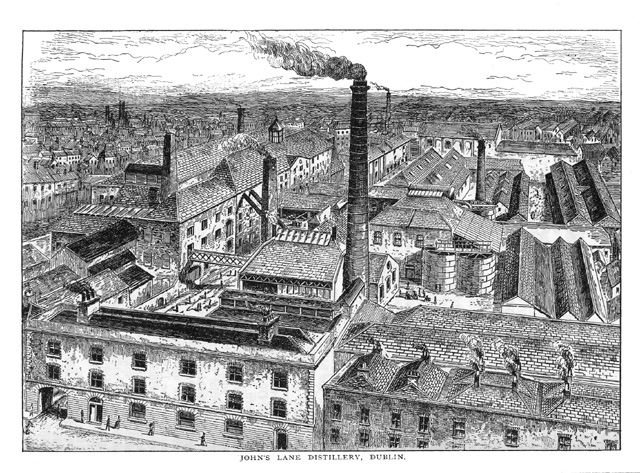
John's Lane Distillery, circa 1887.

In 1791 James Power, an innkeeper from Dublin, established a small distillery at his public house at 109 Thomas St., Dublin. The distillery, which had an output of about 6,000 gallons in its first year of operation, initially traded as James Power and Son, but by 1822 had become John Power & Son, and had moved to new premises at John's Lane, a side street off Thomas Street. At the time the distillery had three pot stills, though only one, a 500-gallon still is thought to have been in use.

Following reform of the distilling laws in 1823, the distillery expanded rapidly. In 1827, production was reported at 160,270 gallons, and by 1833 had grown to 300,000 gallons per annum.

As the distillery grew, so too did the stature of the family. In 1841, John Power, grandson of the founder was awarded a baronetcy, a hereditary title. In 1855, his son Sir James Power, laid the foundation stone for the O'Connell Monument, and in 1859 became High Sheriff of Dublin.

In 1871, the distillery was expanded and rebuilt in the Victorian style, becoming one of the most impressive sights in Dublin. After expansion, output at the distillery rose to 700,000 gallons per annum, and by the 1880s, had reached about 900,000 gallons per annum, at which point the distillery covered over six acres of central Dublin, and had a staff of about 300 people.

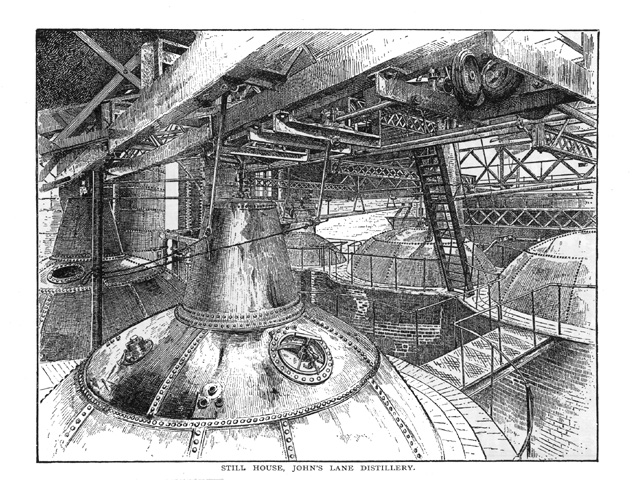
The Still House at John's Lane Distillery, as it looked when Alfred Barnard visited in the 1800s.

During this period, when the Dublin whiskey distilleries were amongst the largest in the world, the family-run firms of John Power, along with John Jameson, William Jameson, and George Roe, (collectively known as the "Big Four") came to dominate the Irish distilling landscape, introducing several innovations. In 1886, John Power & Son began bottling their own whiskey, rather than following the practice customary at the time, of selling whiskey directly to merchants and bonders who would bottle it themselves. They were the first Dublin distillery to do so, and one of the first in the world. A gold label adorned each bottle and it was from these that the whiskey got the name Powers Gold Label.

When Alfred Barnard, the British historian visited John's Lane in the late 1880s, he noted the elegance and cleanliness of the buildings, and the modernity of the distillery, describing it as "about as complete a work as it is possible to find anywhere". At the time of his visit, the distillery was home to five pot stills, two of which with capacities of 25,000 gallons, were amongst the largest ever built. In addition, Barnard was high in his praise for Powers whiskey, noting:

The old make, which we drank with our luncheon, was delicious, and finer than anything we had hitherto tasted. It was as perfect in flavour, and as pronounced in the ancient aroma of Irish Whisky so dear to the hearts of connoisseurs, as one could possibly desire, and we found a small flask of it very useful afterwards on our travels.

The last member of the family to sit on the board was Sir Thomas Talbot Power, who died in 1930, and with him the Power's Baronetcy. However, ownership remained in the family until 1966, and several descendants of his sisters remained at work with the company until recent times.

In 1961, a Coffey still was installed in John's Lane Distillery, allowing the production of vodka and gin, in addition to the testing of grain whiskey for use in blended whiskey. This was a notable departure for the firm, as for many years the big Dublin distilling dynasties had shunned the use of Coffey stills, questioning if their output, grain whiskey, could even be termed whiskey. However, with many of the Irish distilleries having closed in the early 20th century in part due to their failure to embrace a change in consumer preference towards blended whiskey, Powers were instrumental in convincing the remaining Irish distilleries to reconsider their stance on blended whiskey.

In 1966, with the Irish whiskey industry still struggling following Prohibition in the United States, the Anglo-Irish Trade War and the rise of competition from Scotch whiskey, John Power & Son joined forces with the only other remaining distillers in the Irish Republic, the Cork Distilleries Company and their Dublin rivals John Jameson & Son, to form Irish Distillers. Soon after, in a bold move, Irish Distillers decided to close all of their existing distilleries, and to consolidate production at a new purpose-built facility in Midleton (the New Midleton Distillery) alongside their existing Old Midleton Distillery. The new distillery opened in 1975, and a year later, production ceased at John's Lane Distillery and began anew in Cork, with Powers Gold Label and many other Irish whiskeys reformulated from single pot stills whiskeys to blends.

In 1989, Irish Distillers itself became a subsidiary of Pernod-Ricard following a friendly takeover.

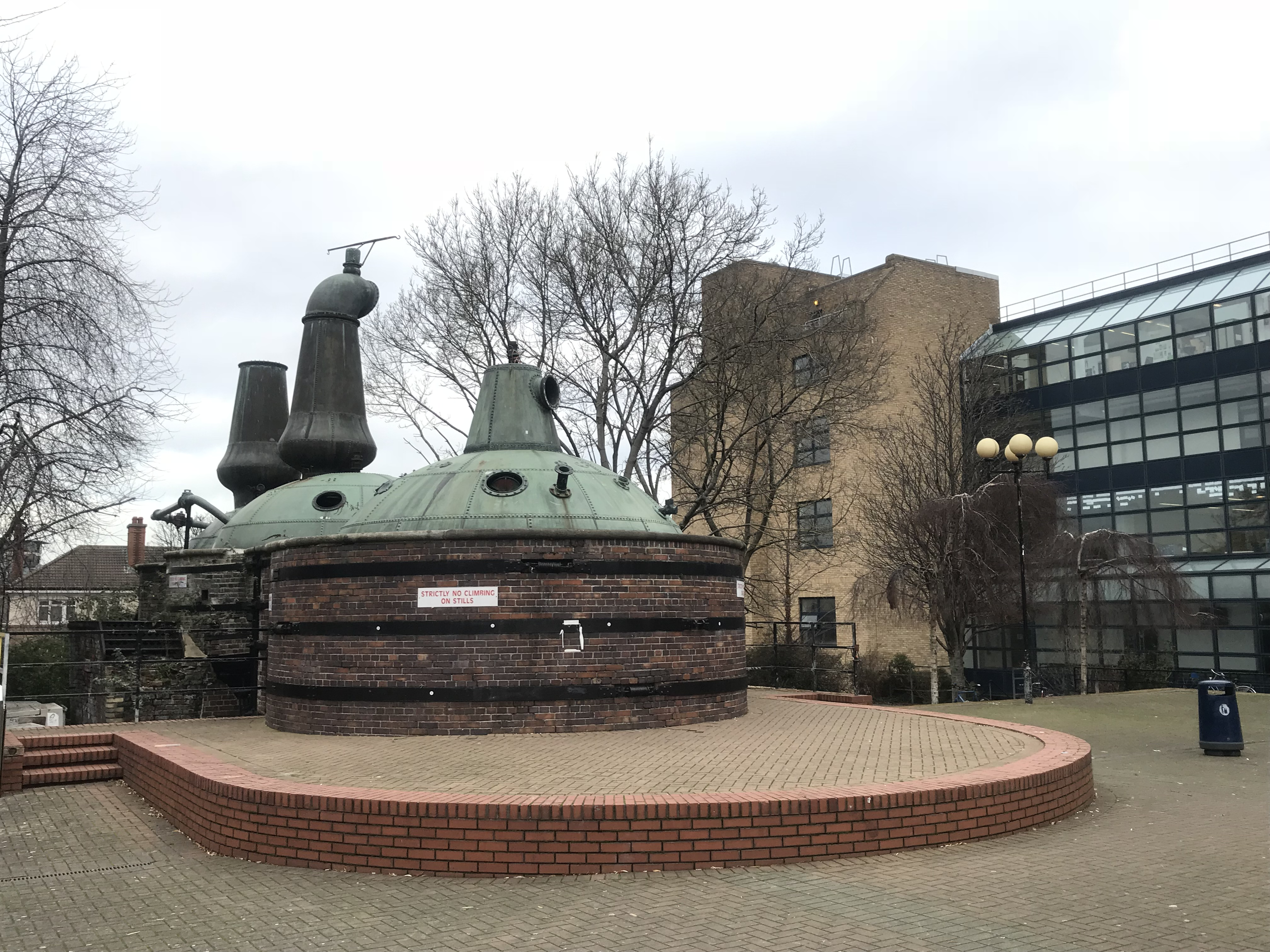
Powers' pot stills preserved at the National College of Art and Design, Dublin

Since the closure of the John's Lane distillery, many of the distillery buildings were demolished. However, some of the buildings have been incorporated into the National College of Art and Design, and are now protected structures. In addition, three of the distillery's pot stills were saved and now located in the college's Red Square.

== Variants ==
In addition to Powers Gold label, a 12-year-old premium blend, and several single pot still whiskeys have been released under the Powers banner in recent years:

- Powers Gold Label, 43% ABV, triple-distilled blend of pot still and grain whiskey, matured in ex-bourbon American Oak casks, non-chill filtered
- Powers 12-year-old Special Reserve, 40% ABV, a blend of 12−21-year-old whiskeys with a high pot still content, matured in ex-Bourbon and sherry casks
- Powers Three Swallow Release, 43.2%, single pot still, matured mainly in ex-Bourbon casks, with some input of whiskey matured in Oloroso Sherry casks
- Powers Signature Release, 46%, single pot still, matured mainly in ex-Bourbon casks, with some input of whiskey matured in Oloroso Sherry casks
- Powers John's Lane Release, 46%, single pot still, 12-year-old, matured mainly in ex-bourbon casks, with some input of whiskey matured in Sherry casks
- Powers Irish Rye, 43.2%, triple distilled in a column still, non age statement, matured in a selection of American oak virgin casks and ex-bourbon casks, with the rye sourced from County Wexford

== Accolades ==
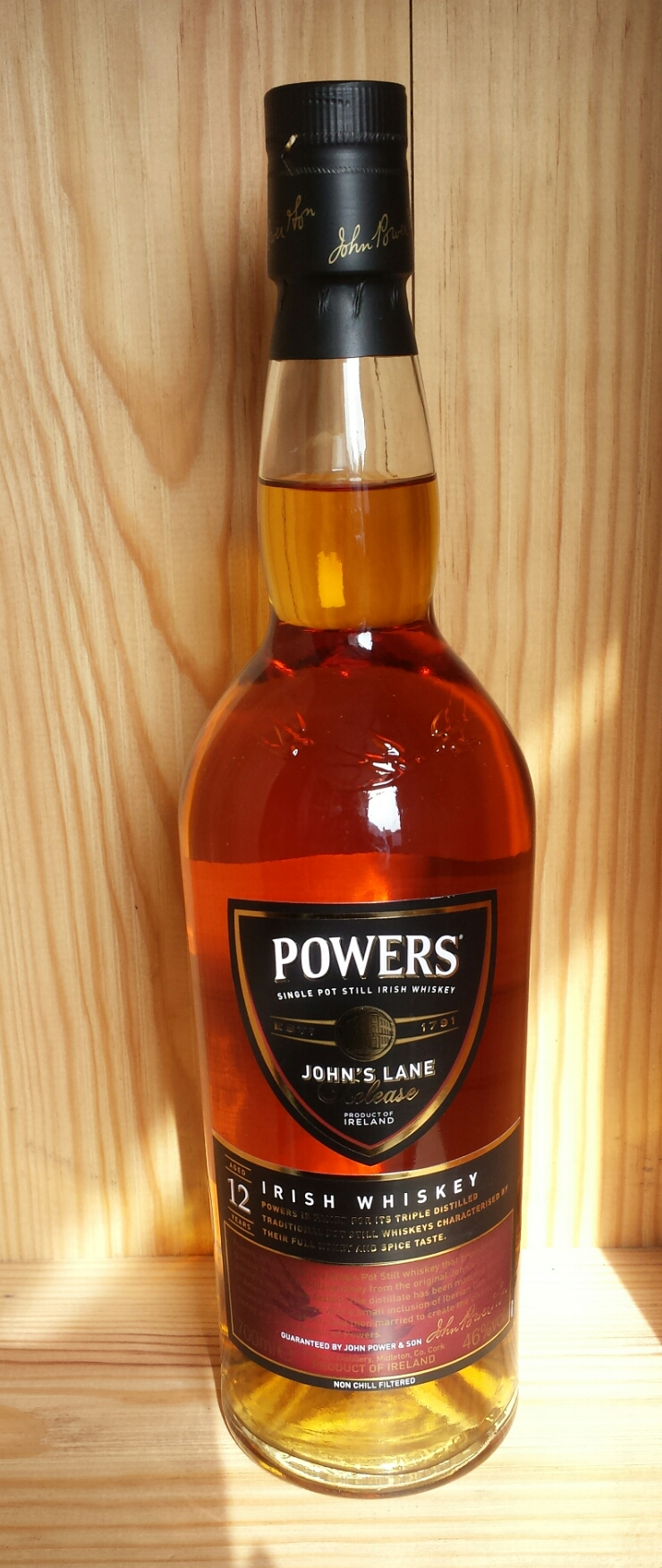
A bottle of Powers John's Lane Release

Powers has had a long history of sponsorship with horse racing within Ireland, evidence mainly by its 40-year support of the Fairyhouse Easter Festival, headlined by the Powers Irish Grand National and Powers Gold Cup, from 1970 to 2010.

In the 2012 edition of the Whisky Bible, whiskey writer Jim Murray named Power's John's Lane Release Irish Whiskey of the Year and described it as "certainly one of the top five world whiskies of the year".

More recently, in 2015, Powers Signature Release won a gold medal in the category Irish Single Pot Still Whiskey at the Irish Whiskey Awards.

== See also ==
- Irish whiskey brands
- Jameson Irish Whiskey
