= Old Midleton Distillery =

Former distillery that was turned in a whiskey museum in Midleton, Ireland

Coordinates: 51°54′49.1″N 8°10′05.2″W

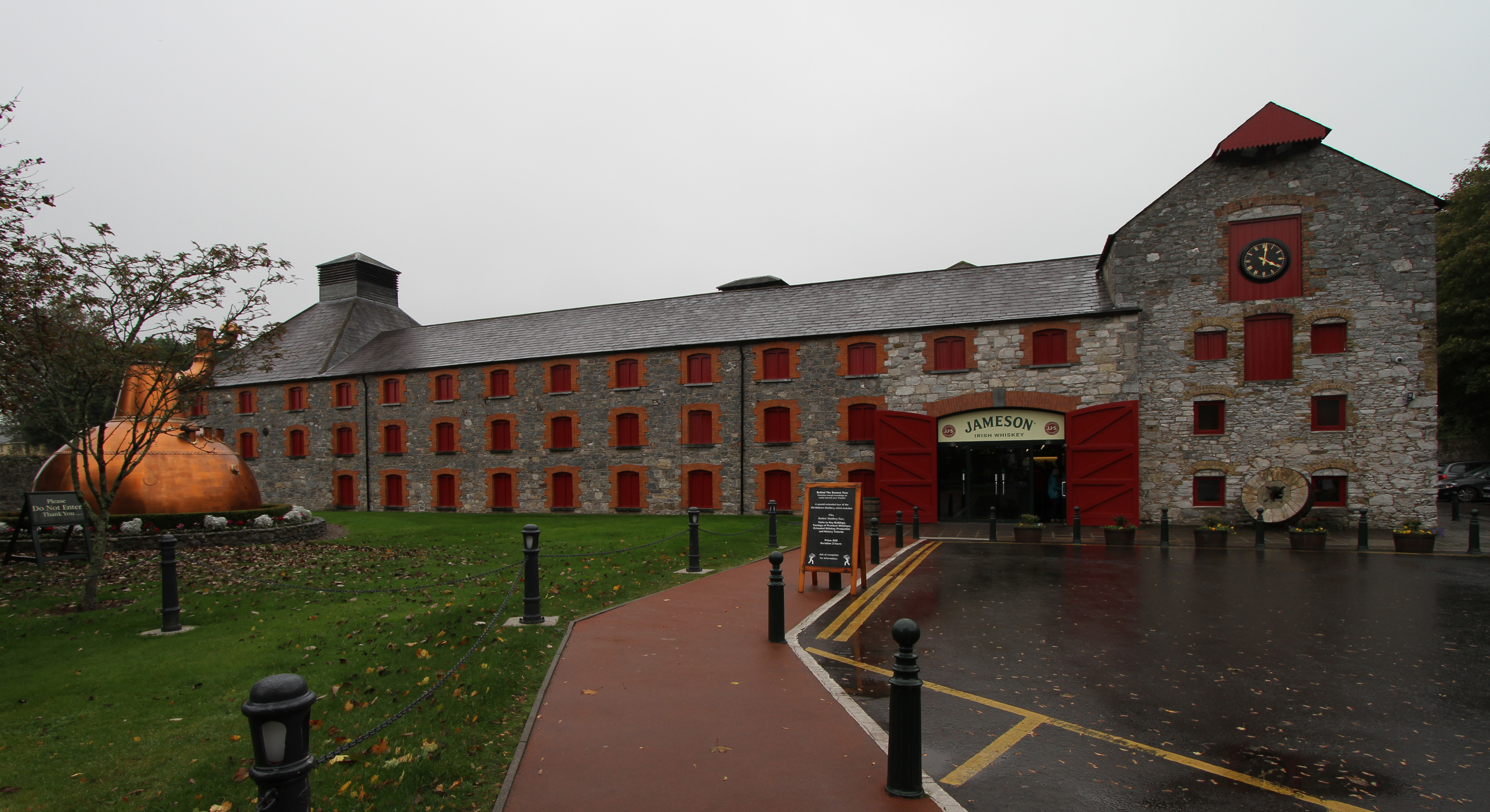
- Location: Old Distillery Walk, Midleton, County Cork, Ireland
- Owner: James Murphy & Company (1825–1868), Cork Distilleries Company (1868–1966), Irish Distillers / Pernod Ricard (1966–present)
- Founded: Distillery: 1825–1975, Visitor Centre: 1992–present
- Founder: James, Daniel and Jeremiah Murphy
- Status: Closed/Museum since 1992
- Water source: Dungourney River
- No. of stills: 3 pot stills (1 x 31,618 gallons, 2 x 10,000 gallons), 1 Coffey still
- Capacity: >1,000,000 gallons per annum
- Website: https://www.jamesonwhiskey.com/en/visit-us/jameson-distillery-midleton

The Old Midleton Distillery, also known as the Jameson Experience, Midleton, is a former Irish whiskey distillery that was turned into a museum and visitor centre located in Midleton, County Cork, Ireland. Set over 15 acres, since opening as a visitor's centre in 1992, the old distillery has received approximately 100,000 guests per year, receiving 125,000 in 2015.

The Old Midleton Distillery in which the Jameson Experience is located began life as a woollen mill, before being converted to a military barracks and subsequently a distillery in 1825. The distillery operated until 1975, when a new distillery was constructed alongside it to house the consolidated operations of three former whiskey-making rivals, John Jameson & Son, John Powers & Son, and Cork Distilleries Company (owners of the Midlelton Distillery), who had come together to form Irish Distillers in 1966. It now houses a visitor centre, a restaurant, and a gift shop.

== History ==
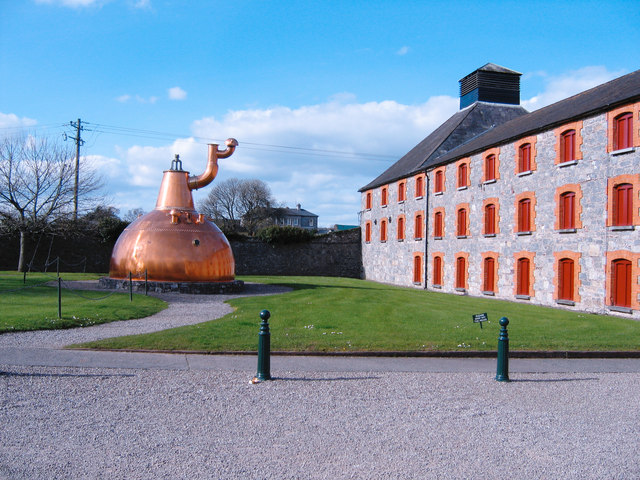
A 31,618 gallon pot still, the largest ever built, once operated at the distillery. No longer in use, it can still be seen inside the old still room. A smaller pot still sits outside the visitor centre.

On 20 May 1796, Marcus Lynch leased land from Viscount Midleton, and having obtained rights to use the waters of the Dungourney River, Lynch in partnership with two London merchants, erected a large woollen mill. Lynch later became the sole owner of the premises following the bankruptcy of his partners. In 1803, during the Napoleonic Wars, this mill was purchased by the Government for £20,000 and converted for uses as a barracks and stables, though part of the premises was leased back to Lynch. Eighteen years later, with both Lynch and the barracks gone, the Government sold the building to Lord Midleton's brother, the Archbishop of Cashel, for £1,750, a steep discount on what they had paid for it. When the Archbishop died in 1824, Lord Midleton bought the property for the same price. On 20 December 1825, Lord Midleton sold the property for £4,000 to three brothers, James, Daniel and Jeremiah Murphy, who hoped to convert it for use as a distillery, the 1823 Excise Act having made distillation far more financially attractive.

The Murphys invested a considerable sum in establishing a large distilling operation at the site, which was to become known as James Murphy and Company. A large undershot timber water wheel was installed to help power the distillery (which was replaced in 1852, by an iron water wheel which survives on-site to this day). In addition, a mammoth 31,618 gallon pot still was constructed at the distillery which remains the largest ever built. The pot still was so large, that it needed to be assembled on-site with the distillery built around it. The ambition of the Murphys (and the effect of the 1823 excise reforms) is underlined by the fact that just two years earlier, the largest pot still in Ireland had a capacity of just 750 gallons. In 1827, Murphy's distillery is reported to have produced over 188,000 proof gallons of spirit, and by the 1830s, distillery output had risen further, to 400,000 proof gallons per annum, with the distillery having a payroll of nearly 200.

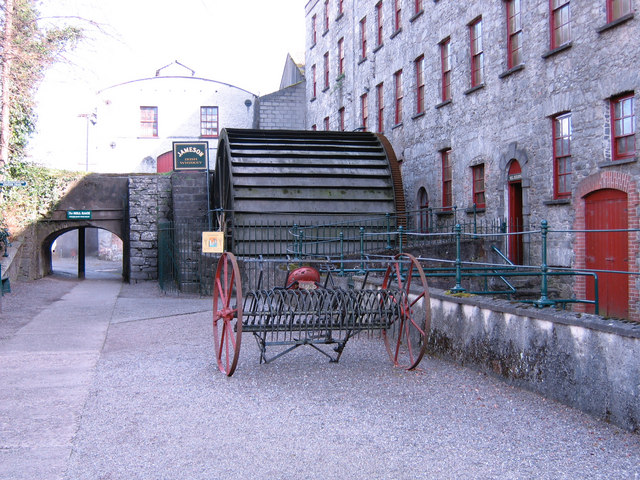
An iron waterwheel, installed in 1852, was used to drive malt grinding stones at the distillery.

In the mid-1800s, the Irish whiskey industry underwent a period of turmoil, with temperance movement of the 1830s, and the Great Famine of the 1840s reducing domestic demand for whiskey. At the time, Cork was home to several distilleries, therefore, in the 1860s, James Murphy (head of the company, and son of the founder), suggested amalgamating the operations of several local distilleries. The other distilleries agreed, so in 1867, Cork Distilleries Company (CDC) was formed, with Murphy at the helm. In 1867, CDC took control of four Cork distilleries: North Mall, The Green, Watercourse and Daly's, and a year later Midleton Distillery joined the fold.

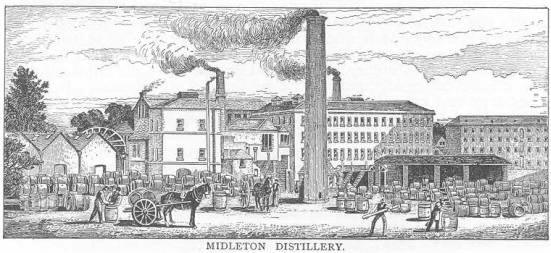
The Midleton Distillery, as it looked when Alfred Barnard visited in 1886.

In 1886, Alfred Barnard, a British historian visited the distillery, describing its location close to both rail and water carriage, amidst large corn-growing country as a desirable location to establish a distillery. In addition to the 31,618 gallon wash still, Barnard stated that the distillery boasted two 10,000 gallon spirits stills, and unusually for an Irish distillery at the time, a Coffey Still. The distillery, which was lit by gas, was reported to have an output in excess of 1,000,000 gallons per annum, and to produce a whiskey known as "The Cork Whisky Make". In later years, whiskey from the distillery was known as Cork Distilleries Company Old Irish Whisky, before becoming known as simply "Paddy".

In the years that followed Barnard's visit, the Irish whiskey industry entered a period of decline, with Irish whiskey losing significant market share due to a variety of events. These included, the rise of blended Scotch whisky, Prohibition in the United States, the Anglo-Irish trade war (which locked Irish exports out of the British Empire).

When Alfred Barnard visited Ireland, there were 28 distilleries in operation, however, by the 1960s, only a handful of these remained in operation. In 1966 three of these (John Jameson & Son, John Powers & Son and Cork Distilleries Company) chose to amalgamate their operations under the name of Irish Distillers and to close their existing facilities, and concentrate their operations in a new purpose-built facility to be constructed alongside the existing distillery in Midleton.

In July 1975, operations ceased at the Old Midleton Distillery and began anew the next day at the New Midleton Distillery, with the Jameson Bow Street Distillery and Powers John's Lane Distillery shutting a year later. As a result, the new distillery, is now home to many Irish whiskeys such as Jameson, Powers, Paddy, Redbreast, Green Spot, previously produced in separate distilleries.

In 1992, the Old Midleton Distillery reopened as a visitor's centre, known as the Jameson Experience.

=== Connection with Murphy's Stout ===
Murphy's Brewery, known for producing Murphy's Irish Stout, was established by two younger members of the Murphy family who left the distillery business to strike out on their own in brewing in the 1850s.

== See also ==
- Old Jameson Distillery, Dublin
