= Green Spot (whiskey) =

Single pot still Irish whiskey

- Type: Irish whiskey
- Manufacturer: Irish Distillers (Pernod Ricard)
- Origin: Ireland
- Introduced: Circa 1920: Bonded Merchant
- Alcohol by volume: 40%
- Related products: Yellow Spot, Red Spot, Blue Spot, Redbreast Pot Still
- Website: spotwhiskey.com

Green Spot is a single pot still Irish whiskey, produced specifically for Mitchell & Son of Dublin by Irish Distillers at the Midleton Distillery in County Cork, Ireland. Green Spot is one of the few remaining bonded Irish whiskeys, along with Mitchell's three older offerings, Yellow Spot, Red Spot, and Blue Spot. It is one of only four whiskeys specifically produced for and sold by an independent wine merchant in Ireland.

== History ==
In 1805, William Mitchell established a bakery and confectionery business on Dublin's Grafton Street. In 1887, the business expanded into the wine and spirit trade at a location on nearby Kildare Street. At the time, it was common practice in Ireland for merchants to purchase distillate in bulk from whiskey distilleries and then mature it themselves in their own casks in bonded warehouses. The merchants had ample supplies of casks due to the importation of wine and fortified wines such as port and sherry. Therefore, it was a natural progression for Mitchell & Son to enter the bonded whiskey trade.

Using distillate obtained from Jameson's nearby Bow Street Distillery, Mitchell & Son matured whiskey in a mix of casks that had been used to hold both dark and light sherries in their cellars under Fitzwilliam Lane in Dublin. For the first five years of maturation, half of the whiskey was aged in casks that had previously held Oloroso and other darker sherries, with the other half aged in casks that had held lighter finos. This combination prevented the darker wines from overpowering the whiskey. After five years, whiskeys from the respective light and dark sherry casks were then vatted together and allowed to mature for an additional five years in neutral oak.

Mitchell & Son's whiskey was originally marketed as "Pat Whisky", with the labels featuring the logo of a man on a green background. However, in 1933, it was rebranded as "John Jameson & Son 10 Year Old Green Seal" and later became known simply as Green Spot.

Mitchell & Son sold a range of whiskeys under the "Spot" brand. The name itself originated from Mitchell's practice of marking casks of different ages with a spot of colored paint. There was a 7-year-old Blue Spot, a 12-year-old Yellow Spot, and a 15-year-old Red Spot. However, it was the 10-year-old Green Spot that emerged as the company's most popular whiskey, and it was the only Spot whiskey to remain in continuous production until the present. Although it relaunched in 2012, Yellow Spot ceased bottling for decades in the late 1950s. According to posts on the Irish Whiskey Club's Facebook page in August 2018, Red Spot was re-introduced to the lineup in November 2018, again based on old family recipes from before it was discontinued 50 years prior, and Blue Spot was re-introduced to the lineup in November, 2020, after being discontinued for 56 years.

In 1971, Irish Distillers closed its Dublin distilleries (including Bow Street) and consolidated production in Midleton. As a result, the makeup of the whiskey was altered for the first time in known history. This change, coupled with low stocks of maturing whiskey, led Mitchell & Son to make an agreement with Irish Distillers to mature the whiskey onsite in Irish Distillers' own casks, with Mitchell & Son having sole rights to market, sell, and develop the whiskey.

== Current production ==
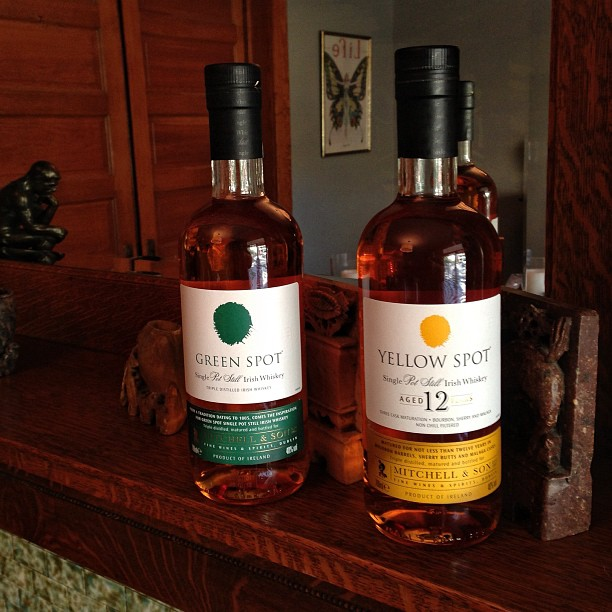
Bottles of Green Spot and Yellow Spot Single Pot Still Irish whiskeys

Modern Green Spot is slightly younger than the original. Previously a 10-year-old whiskey, it is now a non-age statement whiskey, made from a blend of 7-10-year-old single pot still whiskeys that have matured in a combination of new and refill bourbon casks and sherry casks.

Because Green Spot is produced in limited quantities (only 12,000 bottles per year) and was historically mainly sold through Mitchell & Son's Dublin shop, it was previously difficult to obtain outside of Ireland. However, in recent years, distribution of Green Spot has become more widespread. For instance, it was launched in the United States for the first time in 2014 and is now available in retailers across France.

In recent years, four special bottlings of Green Spot have been released:

- Green Spot 10 Year Old, 40% ABV, batch of 1,000 bottles released to celebrate Mitchell & Son's 200th year in existence
- Green Spot Château Léoville Barton, 46% ABV, regular Green Spot matured in sherry and bourbon casks but finished for up to 18 months in oaken Bordeaux wine casks from the Irish-owned Château Léoville-Barton
- Green Spot Château Montelena, 46% ABV, matured in traditional sherry and bourbon casks and then finished for 12 months in French Oak Zinfandel wine casks from Château Montelena in the Napa Valley
- Green Spot Quails' Gate, 46% ABV, matured in traditional sherry and bourbon casks and then finished for 16 months in Pinot Noir wine casks from Quails' Gate in the Okanagan Valley in British Columbia Canada. A limited edition released in March 2023.
- Green Spot Single Cask, 54.9% ABV, batch of 312 bottles of 10-year-old Green Spot finished for 8 months in ex-Vinsanto wine cask, a greek sweet dessert wine.

== Yellow Spot ==
Yellow Spot Whiskey

In May 2012, Mitchell & Son re-introduced the Yellow Spot variant based on information in company archives. Bottling of Yellow Spot had previously ceased in the 1950s, but information in original company journals and ledgers allowed Mitchell & Son to determine the original Yellow Spot was a blend of 12-year-old pot still whiskeys that were matured in a combination of Malaga wine casks (which impart a slightly sweet taste), bourbon barrels, and sherry butts.

Although Malaga-matured Irish pot still whiskey is a rarity in modern production, when Mitchell & Son checked Irish Distillers' inventory, it found a supply of 12-year-old Malaga-matured pot still whiskey. This allowed Mitchell & Son to re-launch Yellow Spot using the same style of whiskey that was contained in the original.

When Mitchell & Son initially relaunched Yellow Spot, the plan was to produce limited batches of 500 cases per annum.

== Red Spot ==
Red Spot was re-introduced to the lineup in November 2018, again based on old family recipes from before it was discontinued 50 years prior. This bottling is aged in bourbon barrels and sherry butts much like the other Spot Whiskeys, but with the addition of Marsala wine casks as well for a total of at least 15 years.

== Blue Spot ==
Blue Spot was re-introduced to the lineup in November 2020 using whiskey matured in Bourbon, Sherry, and Madeira casks to reflect the historical Blue Spot. The re-introduction was released at an age statement of 7 years, non-chill filtered and bottled at cask strength 56.7% ABV, but the ABV will vary annually. Blue Spot was last sold in 1964 prior to the reindroduction.

== Gold Spot ==
Gold Spot was released in commemoration of the 135th year of Spot Whiskey releases by Mitchell & Son in June 2022 using whiskey matured in bourbon barrels, sherry butts, Bordeaux wine casks, and Port pipes, non-chill filtered, aged for 9 years and bottled at 51.4% ABV.

== Accolades ==
Green Spot has received high scores at several international spirit ratings competitions.

- Ultimate Spirits Challenge 2017 - 89 points.
- International Spirits Challenge 2016 - Silver Award.
- Beverage Tasting Institute 2016 - 91 points.
- Ultimate Spirit Challenge 2016 - 95 points.
- Green Spot Château Léoville Barton was awarded "Best single pot still whiskey" at the 2016 World Whiskies Awards.

== Notability ==
The "Spot" range of whiskeys are amongst a handful of single pot still whiskeys in existence today, with Green Spot being the only one to have remained in continuous production since the early 1900s (Redbreast, the other long established Irish single pot still whiskey, briefly ceased production in the 1980s). Although once the most popular style of whiskey consumed in the world, pot still whiskey fell out of favor in the 20th century, due in part to the rise of cheaper, less intense blended whiskeys. As a result of declining demand, most Irish whiskeys were either reformulated as blends or discontinued.

Single pot still whiskeys, which are historically unique to Ireland, are similar to single malts in that they are produced solely from pot still distillate. However, in contrast to malts that only use malted barley in the mash, single pot still whiskeys are produced from a mixed mash that contains a minimum of 30% malted and a minimum of 30% unmalted barley. The remainder of the mash can be made up of either malted or unmalted barley, and can include up to 5% of other unmalted cereals including wheat, oats, rye, and corn.

== See also ==
- Irish whiskey
- Single pot still whiskey
- Redbreast
