= Spiritory =

German online marketplace

- Type: GmbH (private)
- Industry: E-commerce, FinTech
- Founded: 2022; 4 years ago in Munich, Germany
- Founders: Janis Wilczura, Clemens Bennier
- Headquarters: Munich, Germany
- Area served: 11 European countries
- Key people: Janis Wilczura (CEO)
- Products: Online marketplace for whisky, spirits, wine
- Website: spiritory.com

Spiritory is a Munich-based online marketplace for whisky, rum, cognac, wine, and other spirits, founded by Janis Wilczura and Clemens Bennier in 2022. The company operates in 11 European countries. Categories traded include Scotch whisky, Japanese whisky, bourbon, rum, cognac, wine, and champagne.

== History ==
The startup company was founded by Janis Wilczura and Clemens Bennier in Munich in March 2022. The idea originated when Wilczura purchased a Japanese whisky bottle during a trip to Japan and found existing secondary-market platforms inadequate for reselling it. The platform launched in mid-2022.

In February 2024, Business Punk included Wilczura in its annual "Watchlist" of 100 people to watch. In October 2024, the company completed a pre-seed financing round that included Ludwig Fresenius Pioneer Ventures AG, Andreas Wiele (former ProSiebenSat.1 supervisory board chairman), and Hochschule Fresenius. By 2024, the platform had several thousand users and trading volume in the millions of euros.

In September 2025, Pernod Ricard's German division entered into a direct-to-consumer distribution agreement with Spiritory for premium whisky brands including Chivas Regal, The Glenlivet, Redbreast, and Midleton.

In January 2026, a further financing round included German comedian Michael Mittermeier among new and existing investors.

== Business model ==
Spiritory serves as an online marketplace, facilitating trades between sellers and buyers. The platform provides standardized product pages; sellers list bottles and sold bottles must pass authentication before completing transactions. Sellers must ship sold products to the buyer after authentication; items that do not meet the platform's quality standards are rejected. Spiritory features a stock market-like variable pricing framework using a proprietary algorithm that combines historical sales data with current bid and ask prices to generate market values. The platform discloses price histories and offers portfolio management tools for tracking collections. The company's coverage and user base are concentrated primarily in the European market.

== See also ==
- StockX – marketplace using a similar bid-ask model for sneakers and other goods
- Chrono24 – marketplace for luxury watches
