= Irish Distillers =

Distiller of Irish whiskey

Irish Distillers Pernod Ricard
- Industry: Drink industry
- Founded: 1966
- Headquarters: Dublin, Ireland
- Area served: Ireland, Europe
- Key people: Nodjame Fouad (CEO)
- Products: Alcoholic Beverages
- Number of employees: 600+ (2016)
- Parent: Pernod Ricard
- Website: www.irishdistillers.ie

Irish Distillers is a subsidiary of the French drinks conglomerate Pernod Ricard. It is the largest distiller of Irish whiskey, distilling popular brands such as Jameson and Powers, in addition to premium whiskeys such as Redbreast and Midleton Very Rare. In addition to whiskey, Irish Distillers also produces a number of other spirit products such as gin and vodka.

== History ==
Irish Distillers Group was formed as Irish Distillers Limited (IDL) in 1966, when a merger took place between three Irish whiskey distilleries, Cork Distilleries Company, John Jameson & Son and John Power & Son. In an attempt to reverse the decline in Irish whiskey sales, the board of directors decided to close their existing distilleries in Cork and Dublin, and to consolidate production at a new purpose-built facility. A site alongside the existing distillery in Midleton, County Cork was chosen as the location for the new distillery, as there was no room for expansion alongside the Dublin distilleries.

In 1972, Bushmills, the only other whiskey distillery in operation in Ireland at the time, joined the group, giving Irish Distillers complete control over all whiskey production on the island of Ireland. One Friday in July 1975, production ceased at the Old Midleton Distillery and began the next Monday morning at the new Midleton complex, with distillation at the two Dublin distilleries come to an end a year later. The distillery at Bushmills, County Antrim remained in operation.

The Old Midleton Distillery and Jameson's Bow Street Distillery have since reopened as visitors' centres. In contrast, much of Powers John's Lane distillery has been demolished, with the remaining buildings, now protected structures, forming part of the National College of Art and Design.

In June 1988, following a hostile takeover attempt from Grand Metropolitan, Allied-Lyons and Guinness, Irish Distillers was the subject of a white knight takeover by Pernod Ricard.

In 2005, Bushmills was sold to rival drinks giant Diageo for £200 million.

In 2016, the Paddy Irish whiskey brand was sold to Sazerac, though as part of the sale agreement, production of the whiskey is to continue at the Midleton Distillery.

In 2021, Knappogue Castle and Clontarf were added to Irish Distillers portfolio of Irish whiskeys.

== Brands ==
Irish Distillers beverage brands include:

- Irish whiskey:
  - Irish single malts: Knappogue Castle, Method and Madness
  - Single pot still whiskeys :Green Spot (produced exclusively for Mitchell & Son Wine Merchants), Powers, Redbreast
  - Blended Irish whiskeys: Clontarf 1014, Jameson, Midleton Very Rare
- Beer: Eight Degrees Brewing Company
- Gin: Cork Dry Gin, Method and Madness Gin
- Vodka: Huzzar

== See also ==
- Cooley Distillery
- Irish Whiskey
- Jameson's Bow Street Distillery
