= Knappogue Castle Irish Whiskey =

Single malt Irish whiskey

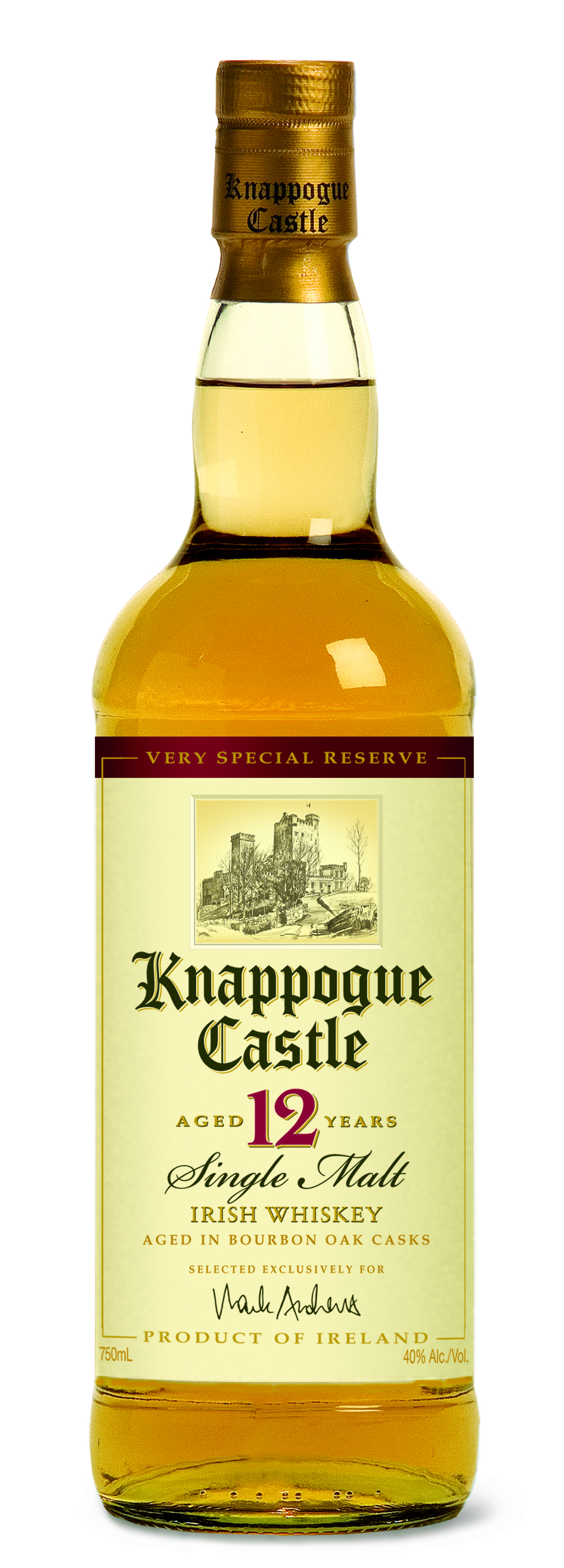
- Knappogue Castle 12 Year Old
- Type: Irish whiskey
- Manufacturer: Irish Distillers (Pernod Ricard)
- Origin: Ireland
- Introduced: 1998
- Alcohol by volume: 40%

Knappogue Castle Irish Whiskey is a brand of premium single malt Irish whiskey produced by the Irish Distillers subsidiary of Pernod Ricard. The brand is named for the historic Knappogue Castle in County Clare, Ireland, originally built by Clan MacNamara in 1467. Knappogue Castle is known for bottling one of the oldest and rarest known Irish whiskies, Knappogue Castle 1951, a pot still whiskey produced at the now-defunct B. Daly Distillery.

== History ==
In 1966, Mark Edwin Andrews and his wife Lavone´ purchased Knappogue Castle in County Clare. As they renovated the structure, Mark Andrews amassed a collection of rare single malt Irish whiskey, which he privately bottled and named Knappogue Castle 1951 after the historic building. He focused primarily on the whiskeys once produced at the B. Daly Distillery in County Offaly, which ceased whiskey production in 1954. The castle was purchased by Shannon Development in 1996, and is now a venue for weddings and banquets.

In 1998, his son, Mark Edwin Andrews III, launched Great Spirits LLC, which made Knappogue Castle 1951 available to the public. In 1999, the company introduced vintage-dated single malts, under the same brand name. In 2003, the Great Spirits was merged into Castle Brands Inc, and in 2010, Castle Brands introduced Knappogue Castle 12 Year Old Single Malt. Knappogue continues to source its whiskey from other distilleries including the Cooley Distillery.

In 2021, Knappogue Castle Irish Whiskey was bought by Irish Distillers, a subsidiary of Pernod Ricard.

== Variants ==
Knappogue Castle has several different products it releases under the Knappogue brand name.

- Knappogue Castle 12 Year Old Single Malt: Marketed as a “super premium” Irish single-malt, Knappogue Castle is distilled three times, and adds no color to its final product. It is aged in bourbon barrels for 12 years before bottling. 80 proof.
- Knappogue Castle 14 Year Old Twin Wood: A blend of Irish single malt aged 14 years in bourbon casks, and Irish single malt aged in Oloroso sherry casks. 92 proof.
- Knappogue Castle 16 Year Old Twin Wood: Aged for 14 years in bourbon casks, then aged for 21 months in Oloroso sherry casks. 80 proof
- Knappogue Castle 1951: This single pot still whiskey was distilled in 1951 at Old Tullamore Distillery and aged in sherry casks for 36 years, before being bottled in 1987.

Limited Releases:

- Knappogue Castle Master Distillers
- Knappogue Castle 17 Year Old
- Knappogue Castle 1949: "A Very Special Reserve of Unblended Pot Still Pure Malt, 30 Years of Age, Put down in 1949, Bottled in Bond in 1981. Produced for the Hon. Mark Edwin Andrews." this release is older than the 1951 and much more rare.

== Reviews ==
Knappogue Castle Whiskey is generally well received. Drinkspirits.com called Knappogue Castle 12 Year Old “a perfect example of a great Irish whiskey that manages to capture a great deal of flavor and complexity from the malted barley and present them in a light and affable manner.” In 2014, Knappogue received a rating of 92 (Recommended) at the Ultimate Beverage Challenge.

== See also ==
- Irish Whiskey
- Irish whiskey brands
