= Jameson Irish Whiskey =

Single distillery Irish whiskey (1780–)

Coordinates: 53°20′54.15″N 6°16′35.61″W

Jameson
- Type: Irish Whiskey
- Manufacturer: Irish Distillers (Pernod Ricard)
- Origin: Ireland
- Introduced: 1780; 246 years ago
- Alcohol by volume: 40%
- Variants: Original, Crested, Black Barrel, Black Barrel Cask Strength, Signature, Makers Series, 18 Year Old and 18 Year Old Bow Street release.
- Related products: Powers, Redbreast, Spot Whiskeys and Midleton Very Rare
- Website: jamesonwhiskey.com

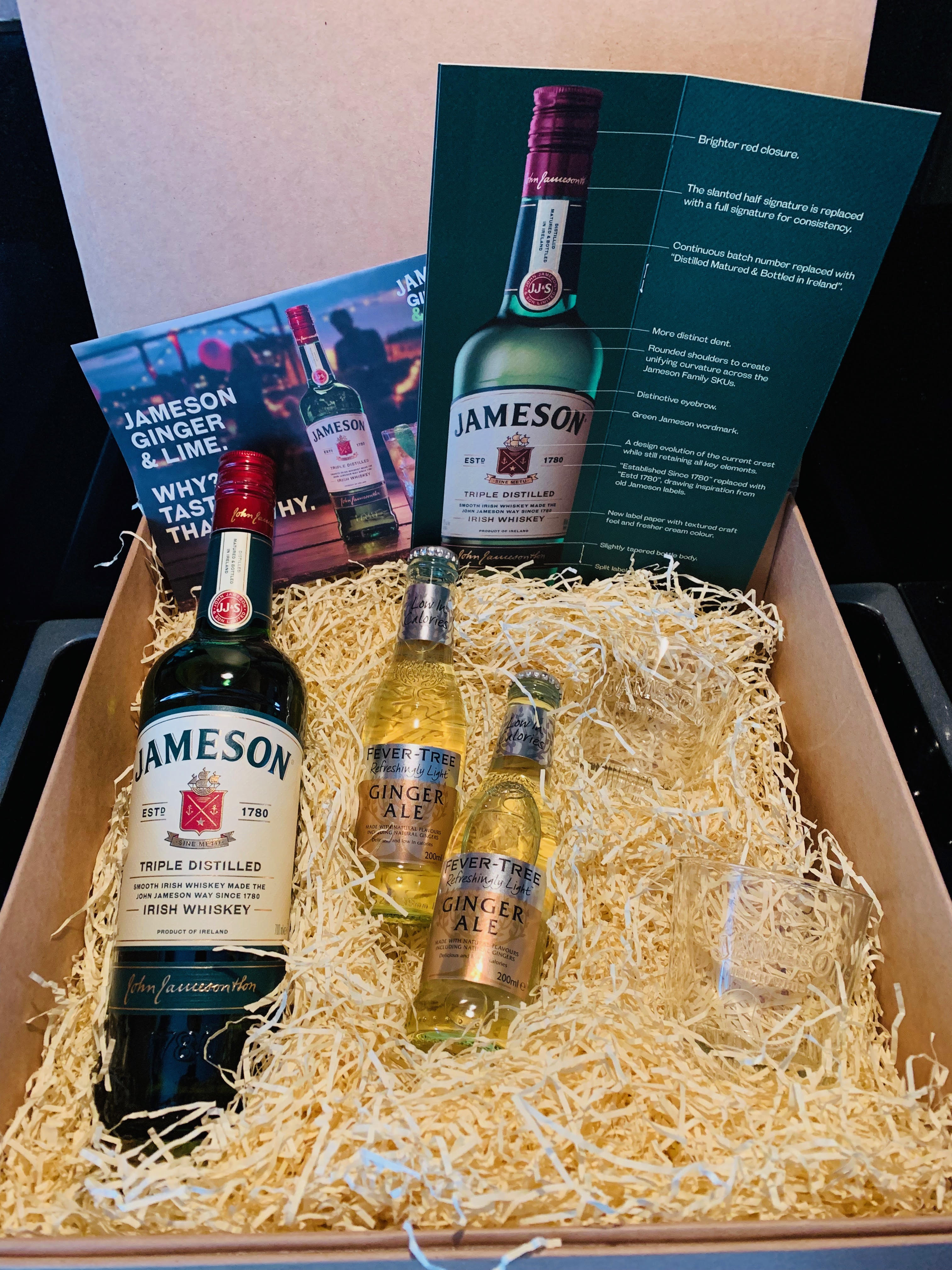
2019 launch of the new Jameson Original label

Jameson (/ˈdʒeɪməsən, ˈdʒɛməsən, ˈdʒeɪmsən/) is a blended Irish whiskey produced by the Irish Distillers subsidiary of Pernod Ricard. Originally one of the six main Dublin whiskeys at the Jameson Distillery Bow St., Jameson is now distilled at the New Midleton Distillery in County Cork. It is by far the best-selling Irish whiskey in the world; in 2019, annual sales passed 8 million cases. It has been sold internationally since the early 19th century, and is available in over 130 countries.

== Company history ==
=== John Jameson and his family ===
John Jameson (1740–1823) was originally a lawyer from Alloa in Scotland before he founded his distillery in Dublin in 1780. Previous to founding the distillery, he married Margaret Haig (1753–1815) in 1768. She was the eldest daughter of John Haig, a whisky distiller in Scotland. John and Margaret had a family of 16 children, eight sons and eight daughters. Portraits of the couple by Sir Henry Raeburn are on display in the National Gallery of Ireland.

John Jameson joined the Convivial Lodge No. 202, of the Dublin Freemasons on 24 June 1774 and in 1780, Irish whiskey distillation began at Bow Street. In 1805, he was joined by his son John Jameson II who took over the family business that year, and for the next 41 years, John Jameson II built up the business before handing over to his son John Jameson the 3rd in 1851. In 1901, the Company was formally incorporated as John Jameson and Son Ltd.

Four of John Jameson's sons followed his footsteps in distilling in Ireland, John Jameson II (1773–1851) at Bow Street, William and James Jameson at Marrowbone Lane in Dublin (where they partnered their Stein relations, calling their business Jameson and Stein, before settling on William Jameson & Co.). The fourth of Jameson's sons, Andrew, who had a small distillery at Enniscorthy, County Wexford, was the grandfather of Guglielmo Marconi, inventor of wireless telegraphy. Marconi's mother was Annie Jameson, Andrew's daughter; her brother, James Sligo Jameson, Andrew's son, would become a celebrated naturalist and traveller in Africa, identifying the black honey-buzzard in 1877, and three African bird species – Jameson's antpecker, Jameson's firefinch, and Jameson's wattle-eye – are named after him.

John Jameson's eldest son, Robert, took over his father's legal business in Alloa. The Jamesons became the most important distilling family in Ireland, despite the rivalry between the Bow Street and Marrowbone Lane distilleries.

=== 19th century and turbulent times ===
By the turn of the 19th century, it was the second-largest producer in Ireland and one of the largest in the world, producing 1,000,000 gallons annually. Dublin at the time was the centre of world whiskey production. It was the second most popular spirit in the world after rum and internationally Jameson had by 1805 become the world's number one whiskey. Today, Jameson is the world's third-largest single-distillery whiskey.

Historical events, for a time, set the company back. The temperance movement in Ireland had an enormous impact domestically but the two key events that affected Jameson were the Irish War of Independence and the subsequent trade war with the British which denied Jameson the export markets of the Commonwealth, and shortly thereafter, the introduction of prohibition in the United States. While Scottish brands could still be legally shipped to Canada (from where they could be easily smuggled across the Canada–US border) Jameson was excluded from its biggest market for many years.

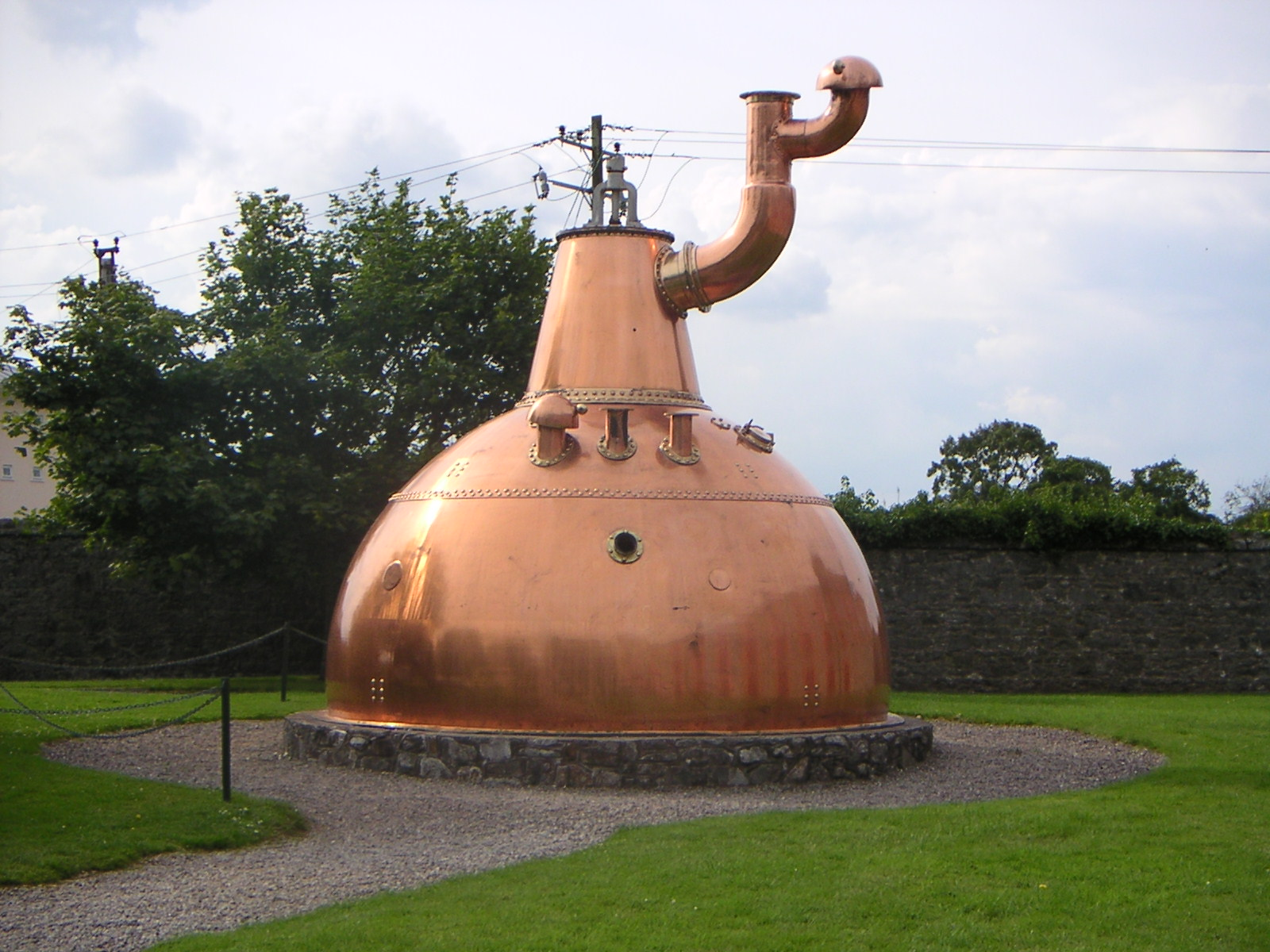
Historical pot still at the Jameson distillery in Cork

The introduction of column stills by the Scottish blenders in the mid-19th century enabled increased production that the Irish, still making labour-intensive single pot still whiskey, could not compete with. There was a legal enquiry somewhere in 1908 to deal with the trade definition of whiskey. The Scottish producers won within some jurisdictions, and blends became recognised in the law of that jurisdiction as whiskey. The Irish in general, and Jameson in particular, continued with the traditional pot still production process for many years.

=== Creation of the Irish Distillers Group ===
In 1966 John Jameson merged with Cork Distillers and John Power to form the Irish Distillers Group. In 1976, the Dublin whiskey distilleries of Jameson in Bow Street and in John's Lane were closed following the opening of a New Midleton Distillery by Irish Distillers outside Cork. The Midleton Distillery now produces much of the Irish whiskey sold in Ireland under the Jameson, Midleton, Powers, Redbreast, Spot and Paddy labels. The new facility adjoins the Old Midleton Distillery, the original home of the Paddy label, which is now home to the Jameson Experience Visitor Centre and the Irish Whiskey Academy. The Jameson brand was acquired by the French drinks conglomerate Pernod Ricard in 1988 when it bought Irish Distillers.

The old Jameson Distillery in Bow Street near Smithfield in Dublin now serves as a museum which offers tours and tastings. The distillery, which is historical in nature and no longer produces whiskey on site, went through a $12.6 million renovation that was concluded in March 2016, and is now a focal part of Ireland's strategy to raise the number of whiskey tourists, which stood at 600,000 in 2017. Bow Street also now has a fully functioning Maturation Warehouse within its walls since the 2016 renovation. It is here that Jameson 18 Bow Street is finished before being bottled at Cask Strength.

==== Boycott call and response ====
In April 2023, the Ukrainian Ambassador to Ireland, Larysa Gerasko, called for a boycott of Jameson Whiskey as the company continued to trade with Russia after sanctions were introduced after the Russian invasion of Ukraine.

On 12 May 2023, Irish Distillers said it would no longer export Jameson to Russia. Irish Distillers said that their parent company Pernod Ricard had decided to cease export of all international brands to Russia. The company also said it would cease distribution of its portfolio in Russia, a process that would take months.

=== Sales ===
Sales volume passed 8 million cases in 2019, a new high for the brand, including sales of 940,000 cases in December alone. It had previously passed 1 million cases in 1996, and 3 million in 2010.

In 2008, The Local, an Irish pub in Minneapolis, sold 671 cases of Jameson (22 bottles a day), making it the largest server of Jameson in the world – a title it maintained for four consecutive years.

== Production process ==
Jameson is produced from a blend of grain whiskey and single pot still whiskey, which uses a mixture of malted and unmalted or "green" Irish barley, all sourced from within a fifty-mile radius around the distillery in Cork. The barley is dried in a closed kiln fired by natural gas (formerly anthracite coal). This is in contrast to the traditional method used in some Scotch whisky distilleries, which fire the kiln with peat, adding a distinctive peat flavour.

== Jameson Crested ==
Jameson Crested (Previously Crested Ten) is a blended whiskey produced by Jameson. It has an ABV of 40%. The brand was launched in 1963 and is Jameson's oldest bottled brand. The majority of the blend is aged for 7–8 years, and is approximately 60% pot still whiskey, and 40% grain whiskey. As of 2025, it is not widely available outside Ireland.

== Awards ==
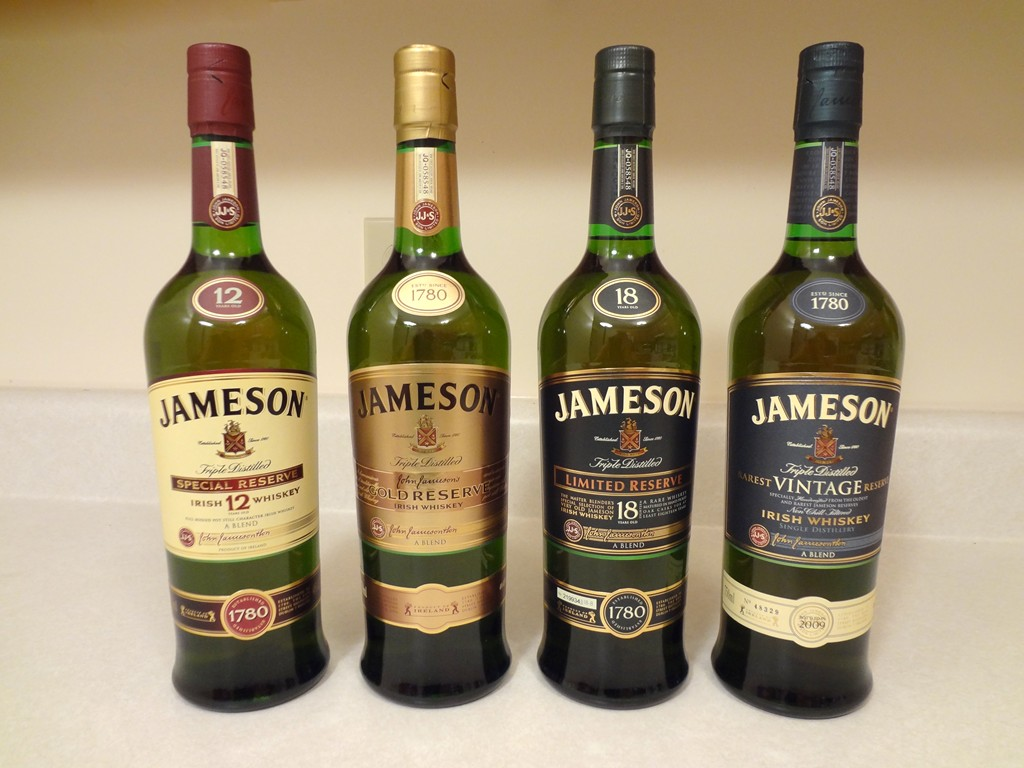
Jameson Special Reserve, Gold Reserve, Limited Reserve, and Rarest Vintage Reserve

Jameson products – in particular its 18-Year and its Rarest Reserve – have rated very highly at international spirits ratings competitions. The 18-Year received a series of gold and double gold medals at the San Francisco World Spirits Competition between 2005 and 2010. The Rarest Reserve has won gold and double gold medals there as well. Rarest Reserve is rated as one of the Top 20 whiskies in the world by Proof66. In 2018, Jameson 18-Year-Old Bow Street won Best Irish Blended Whiskey RRP of €60/$72 or more at the Irish Whiskey Awards.

== Personal ==
John Jameson was also the great grandfather of inventor Guglielmo Marconi.

== See also ==
- Irish whiskey brands
- Scotch whisky
