= Midleton =

Town in County Cork, Ireland

Midleton Mainistir na Corann
- Town
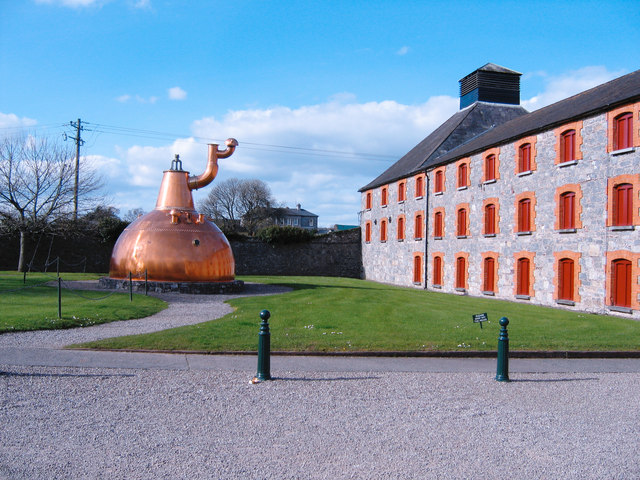
- Old Distillery with copper pot still, Midleton

- Coat of arms
- Motto: Labore et Honore
- Location in Ireland
- Coordinates: 51.916°N 8.175°W
- Country: Ireland
- Province: Munster
- County: Cork
- Dáil Constituency: Cork East
- EU Parliament: South
- Elevation: 5 m (16 ft)

Population (2022)
  - Total: 13,906
- Time zone: UTC±0 (WET)
  - Summer (DST): UTC+1 (IST)
- Eircode routing key: P25
- Telephone area code: +353(0)21
- Irish Grid Reference: W879736

Midleton (/ˈmɪdəltən/; Irish: Mainistir na Corann, meaning "monastery at the weir") is a town in south-eastern County Cork, Ireland. It lies approximately 16 km east of Cork City on the Owenacurra River and the N25 road, which connects Cork to the port of Rosslare. A satellite town of Cork City, Midleton is part of Metropolitan Cork. It is the central hub of business for the East Cork Area. The town is in the civil parish of Middleton. Midleton is within the Cork East Dáil constituency.

== History ==
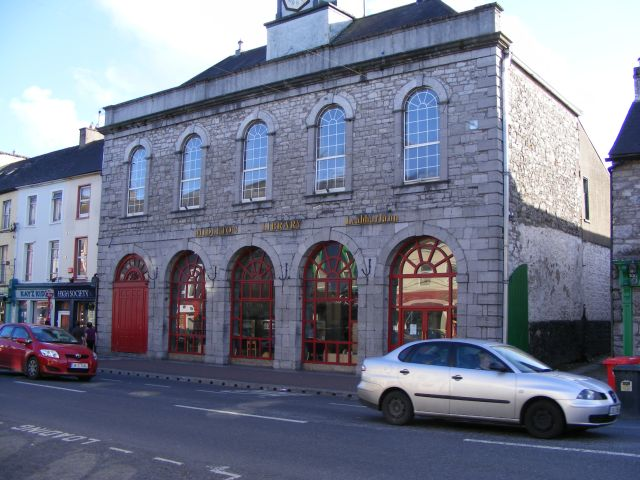
Midleton Library, completed in 1789

In the 1180s advancing Normans led by Barry Fitz Gerald established an abbey at a weir on the river to be populated by Cistercian Monks from Burgundy. The abbey became known as "Chore Abbey" and "Castrum Chor", taking its name from the Irish word cora (weir), although some say that "Chor" comes from "Choir" or "Choral". The abbey is commemorated in the Irish name for Midleton, Mainistir na Corann, or "Monastery at the Weir", and of the local river Owenacurra or Abhainn na Cora meaning "River of the Weirs". St John the Baptist's Church, belonging to the Church of Ireland was erected in 1825 and today still stands on the site of the abbey.

The town gained the name Midleton or "Middle Town" as the main midway town, 10 miles between Cork and Youghal. It was incorporated as a market town and postal depot in 1670, receiving its charter from Charles II, as the "borough and town of Midleton".

Alan Brodrick, Speaker of the Irish House of Commons and Lord Chancellor of Ireland was made the first Baron and Viscount Midleton in 1715 and 1717, respectively. Midleton Market House, now Midleton Library, in Main Street was completed in 1789.

The town is home to the Old Midleton Distillery which was established by James Murphy in 1825. The distillery operated independently until 1868, when it became part of the Cork Distilleries Company, which was later amalgamated into Irish Distillers in 1967. In 1988, Irish Distillers was the subject of a friendly takeover by the French drinks conglomerate Pernod Ricard. The Old Midleton Distillery, which boasts the world's largest pot still – a copper vessel with a capacity of 140,000 litres, was in operation until 1975 when production was transferred to a new purpose-built facility, the New Midleton Distillery. The New Midleton Distillery produces a number of Irish whiskeys, including Jameson Whiskey, Redbreast, and Paddy. It also produces vodka and gin. In 1992, the old distillery was restored and reopened as a visitor centre. Known as the Jameson Experience, the visitor centre hosts a number of attractions, including Ireland's largest working water-wheel (with a diameter of 7m).

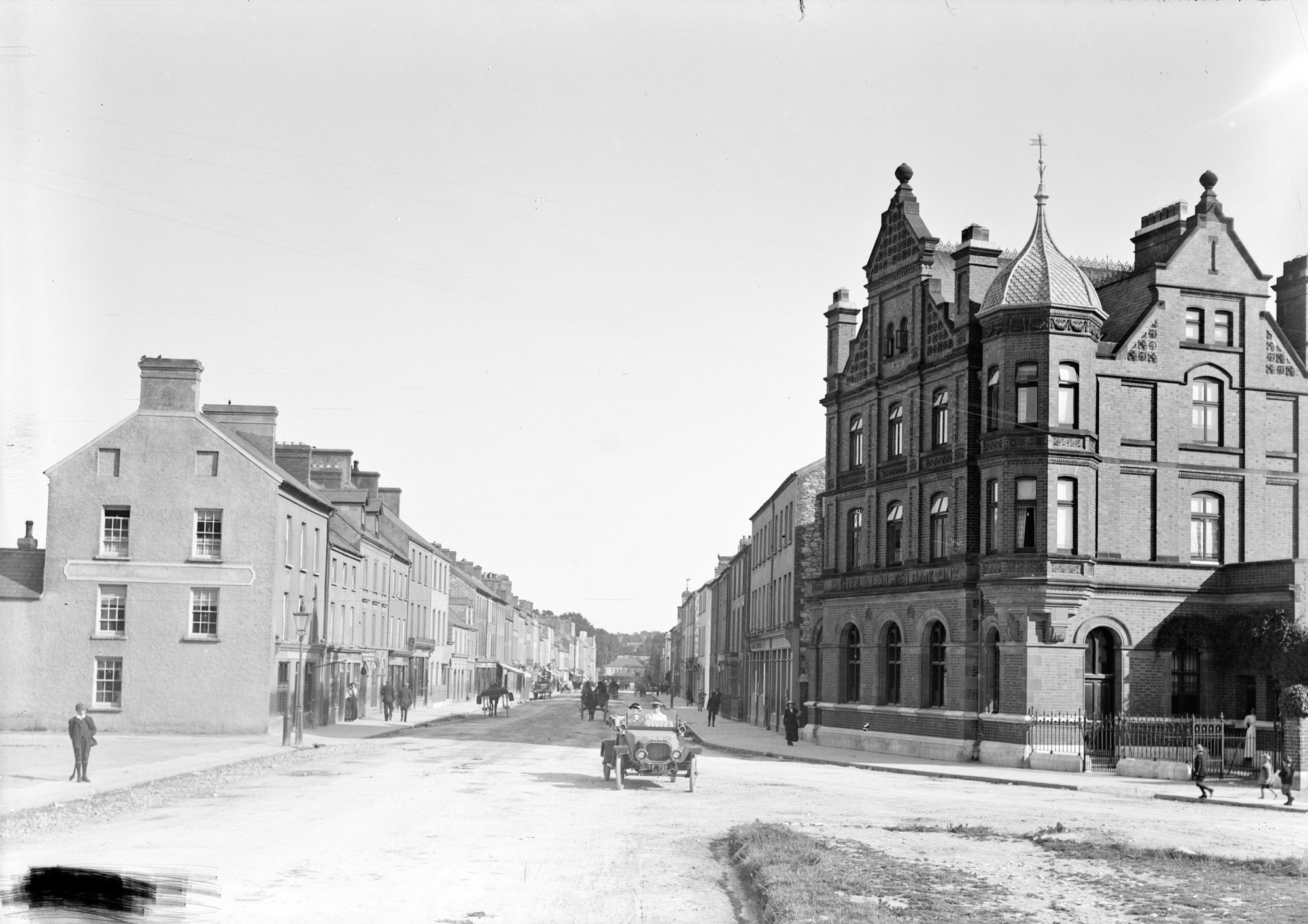
Midleton in the early 20th century

At the top of the main street stands a monument to 16 Irish Republican Army men killed on 20 February 1921 during the Irish War of Independence. Twelve IRA personnel were killed during an unsuccessful ambush of British forces at the nearby town of Clonmult, while four more were captured and two of those later executed.

Two houses designed by Augustus Pugin, later the architect of the Houses of Parliament in London, stand at the bottom of Main Street. They now form one building and house a public bar.

In 2015, a large steel sculpture called Kindred Spirits was installed in Bailick Park. This sculpture commemorates a famine relief donation, made in 1847 by Native American Choctaw people, during the Great Famine.

In December 2015 (during Storm Frank) and in October 2023 (during Storm Babet) a number of businesses were flooded in Midleton, including on the town's main street.

== Education ==
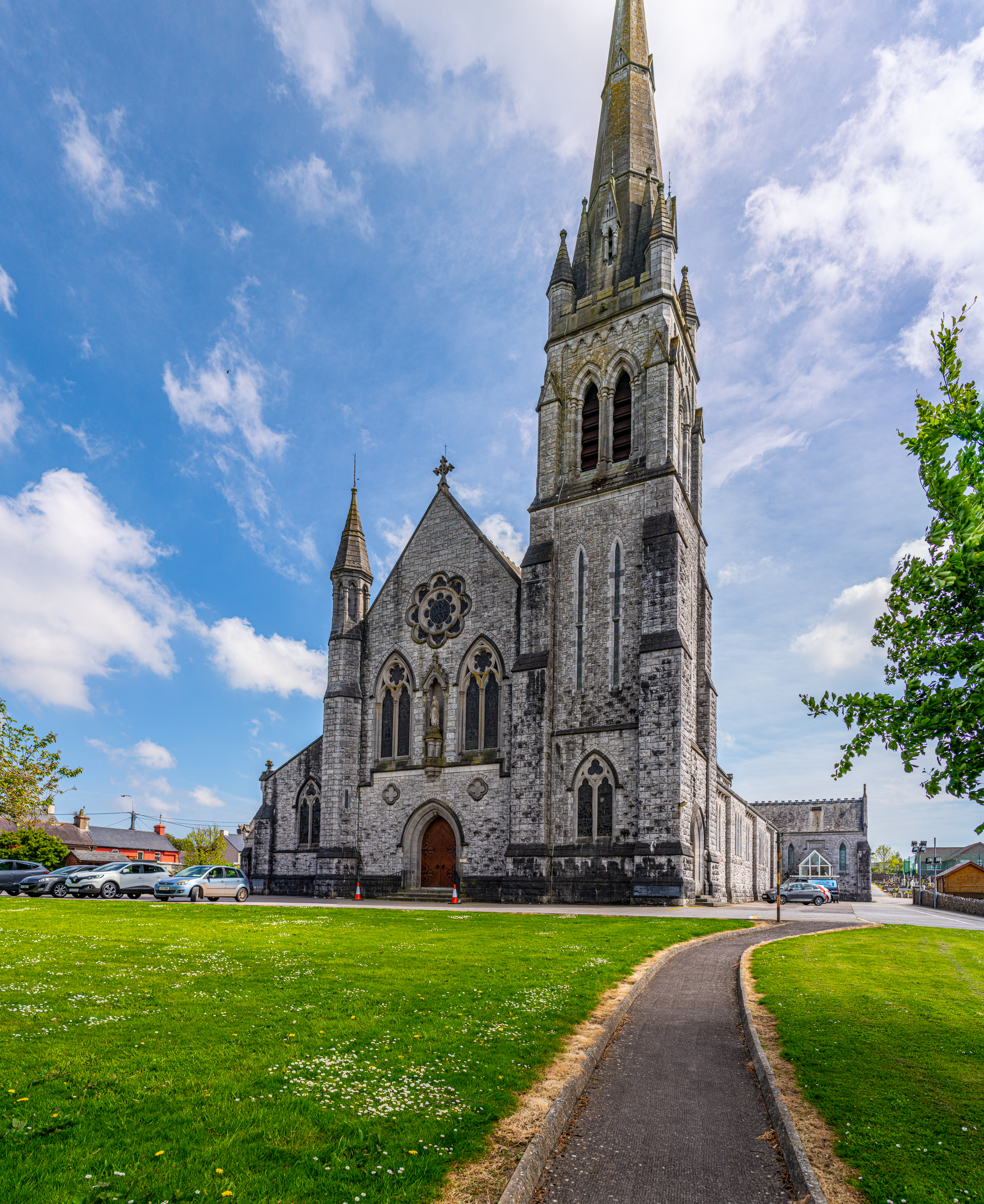
Church of the Holy Rosary

Elizabeth Villiers, former mistress of William of Orange, founded the private school named Midleton College in 1696. The school is traditionally associated with the Church of Ireland. Past pupils include Isaac Butt, founder of the Home Rule League, Reginald Dyer, perpetrator of the Amritsar Massacre and John Philpot Curran, lawyer.

== Economy ==
Local employers include retail, light manufacturing, food production, tourism and whiskey distilling industries. At nearby Whitegate is the state's first gas-fired power station as well as Ireland's only oil refinery. Many Midleton residents also commute to jobs in Cork city, Carrigtwohill or Little Island.

Traditionally the main commercial and retail area of the town was on Main Street and this continues to provide shopping – primarily with local ownership. The commercial part of Midleton has also expanded to the old site of Midleton Mart, now called Market Green. A number of large retailers have outlets in Midleton, including Aldi, Lidl, Tesco and Supervalu. The Market Green shopping centre, opened in 2005 and containing a cinema, is located at the northern end of the town. The Midleton Farmers' Market is held on Saturdays.

Midleton is also the home of the Old Midleton Distillery, a tourist attraction which includes the largest pot-still in the world.

== Geography ==
The town is located in a fertile valley below hills to the north-east of Cork Harbour and the coast to the south. In times past, the channel from the Harbour to nearby Ballinacurra (Irish: Baile na Cora, meaning "Town at the Weir"), was navigable by barges up to 300 tonnes. Due to silting over the years, the channel is now extremely shallow.

== Demographics ==
In the 20 years between the 1996 and 2016 census, the population of the Midleton area effectively doubled, from 6,209 to 12,496 people.

As of the 2022 census, of Midleton's 13,906 inhabitants, 71.01% were white Irish, less than 0.5% white Irish travellers, 16.30% other white ethnicities, 3.36% black, 3.11% Asian, 2.45% other ethnicities, and 3.35% did not state their ethnicity. In terms of religion the area was 67.12% Catholic, 10.36% other stated religions, 18.47% with no religion, and 4.05% not stated.

== Transport ==
=== Rail ===
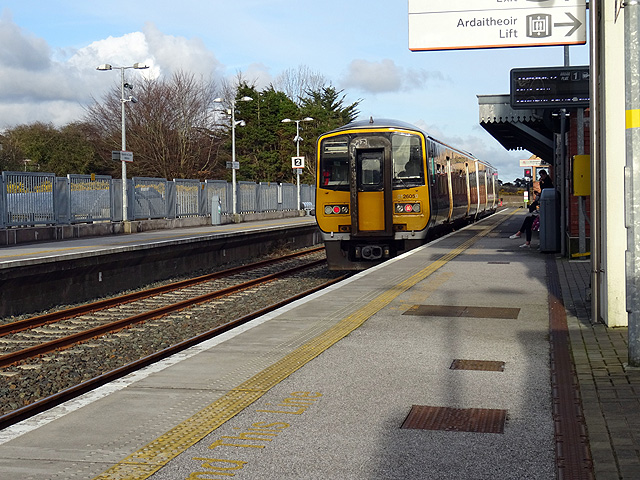
Cork train at Midleton railway station

Midleton railway station is on the Cork Suburban Rail network and is one of two termini (the other being Cobh) into and out of Cork Kent railway station. Passengers interchange at Cork Kent for trains to Dublin and Tralee.

The railway line to Midleton was opened on 10 November 1859 by the Cork & Youghal Railway, a company that was later taken over by the Great Southern & Western Railway. Midleton was the location of the railway works for this company.

The line between Midleton and Cork was closed for regular use between 1963 and 2009. Occasional use (mainly transport of beet from Midleton to the Mallow Sugar Factory) continued for many years after 1963, but even the sporadic usage of the line came to an end in 1988, with the final train to use the track being a passenger excursion for Midleton GAA supporters to Dublin for the final of the All Ireland Senior Club Hurling Championship (in which Midleton played). The reopening of the line was completed by Iarnród Éireann on 30 July 2009.

=== Air ===
The nearest airport is Cork Airport.

=== Bus ===
Bus Éireann run bus services to and from Midleton, including to Cork City Bus Station, Whitegate, Waterford, Ballinacurra, Carrigtwohill, Little Island, Glounthaune and Tivoli.

== Sport ==
Midleton GAA is the local Gaelic Athletic Association club, and Midleton RFC the local rugby club. Martial arts groups include the Midleton Aikido Club [which has been teaching Aikido in East Cork since 2006] and Midleton Taekwondo Club. Midleton F.C. is the local soccer team, and there is also a cricket club.

== Notable people ==
- Richard Bettesworth, lawyer and politician
- Alan Brodrick, lawyer and politician
- John J. Coppinger, U.S. Army major general
- Tom Horan, Australian cricketer
- James Martin, Australian politician and judge
- Colm O'Neill, Gaelic footballer
- Shane O'Neill, footballer
- David Stanton, former TD
- Nora Twomey, Academy Award nominated director and animator
- Elizabeth Villiers, English-born courtier who founded Midleton College

== See also ==
- List of abbeys and priories in Ireland (County Cork)
- List of towns and villages in Ireland
- Market Houses in Ireland
- Midleton (Parliament of Ireland constituency)
- Midleton Very Rare
