= Dingle Distillery =

Irish whiskey distillery

Coordinates: 52.1417°N 10.2893°W

- Location: Dingle
- Owner: Porterhouse Group
- Founded: 2012
- Founder: Oliver Hughes
- Status: Operating
- Water source: Onsite deep well
- No. of stills: 3 large pot stills (whiskey) & 1 small pot still (vodka/gin)
- Website: http://www.dingledistillery.ie/

Dingle Whiskey (Single Malt)
- Type: Single Malt
- Cask type(s): Bourbon Casks
- ABV: 46.5%

Dingle Whiskey (Single Pot Still)
- Type: Single Pot Still
- Cask type(s): Pedro Ximenez Casks
- ABV: 46.5%

Dingle Distillery Vodka
- ABV: 40%

Dingle Original Gin
- ABV: 42.5%

Dingle Distillery is an Irish whiskey distillery established in 2012 and owned by the Porterhouse Brewing Company.

The distillery is located in a converted sawmill in Milltown on the outskirts of Dingle in County Kerry in Ireland. The first whiskeys distilled and matured at the distillery were released in late 2016. In addition to whiskey, the distillery also produces and markets Dingle vodka and Dingle Gin. It bills itself as an 'artisan' distillery.

In 2017, Dingle Distillery became the first independent Irish distillery to release a single pot still whiskey in several decades.

== History ==
The initiative to start a distillery in Dingle was that of the now deceased Oliver Hughes, who was also a founder of the Porterhouse brewing and restaurant group. The site, formerly the Fitzgerald sawmill, was converted for whiskey production in 2012, opening on 29 November. The distillery was reported to have created at least 25 jobs. The new copper pot stills used at the distillery were designed by John McDougall.

As a promotion to attract investors, Dingle Distillery offered the first five hundred special casks to investors "Founding Fathers", to be ready for bottling from November 2017.

The distillery announced plans to double spirit production in 2018.

== Products ==
Using pot stills the distillery produces two casks of whiskey per day in Dingle, where the mildly cool climate is reportedly favourable for whiskey production. Under Irish law, to be termed whiskey, a spirit is legally required to be matured for at least three years. Therefore, Dingle Distillery only brought whiskey to market in late 2016. The distillery also has a still for the production of gin and vodka. As of 2017, 100,000 bottles per year of Dingle gin were being sold.

The first batch of whiskey was released in late 2016, and consisted of two tripled distilled whiskeys, both of which were matured solely in bourbon casks:

- Dingle Single Malt Whiskey, 46.5% (7,500 bottles)
- Dingle Single Malt Whiskey Cask Strength, 60.7% (500 bottles)

The second batch, released in 2017, consisted of four different bottlings, three single malts and a single pot still whiskey:

The company also produced a series of limited edition whiskies which were marketed under names referring to the "Celtic cycle of the year" ("Wheel of the Year").
