= Knappogue Castle =

Medieval tower house, County Clare, Ireland

- Caisleán na Cnapóige
- County Clare, Ireland
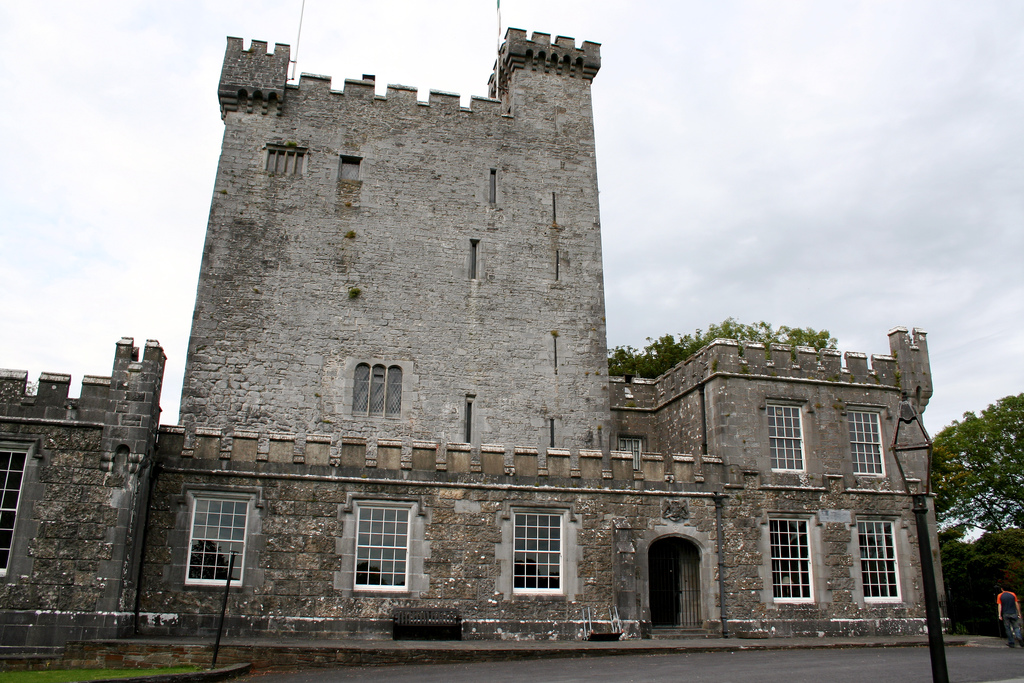
- Knappogue Castle

Site information
- Owner: Shannon Heritage
- Open to the public: no

Location
- Location within Ireland
- Coordinates: 52.793919°N 8.831597°W

Site history
- Built: 1467
- Built by: Seán Mac Conmara (MacNamara)

Knappogue Castle (Irish: Caisleán na Cnapóige) is a tower house, built in 1467 and expanded in the mid-19th century, located in the parish of Quin, County Clare, Ireland. It has been restored and is open to guided tours.

== History ==
The original castle was built in 1467 by Seán Mac Conmara (anglicised as MacNamara), son of Síoda Mac Conmara, and is a good example of a late medieval tower house. The castle's name translates as "castle of the place abounding in little hills".

In 1571, the castle became the seat of the MacNamara (Mac Conmara) sept, the Earls of West Clancullen. Donnchadh Mac Conmara was a leader of the Irish Rebellion of 1641 and Knappogue remained in MacNamara hands throughout the Irish Confederate Wars of the 1640s. After the Cromwellian conquest of Ireland (1649–53) it was confiscated in accord with the Adventurers' Act and its new owner was a roundhead, Arthur Smith.

Arthur Smith occupied the castle from 1659 to 1661. After the monarchy was restored in 1660, Knappogue was returned to its MacNamara owners. Eventually, Francis MacNamara, High Sheriff of Clare in 1789, sold the castle to the Scott family of Cahircon in 1800; the latter carried out major restoration and extension work. In 1837, the castle was owned by William Scott.

In 1855, the castle was acquired by Theobold Fitzwalter Butler, 14th Baron Dunboyne. It became the family seat of the Dunboyne family. They continued the restoration work of the Scotts, adding a drawing-room, the long room and a west wing, including the clock tower and the gateway. The remodelling was done by architects James Pain and his brother George Richard Pain.

During the War of Independence (1919–21), Clare County Council held their meetings at Knappogue Castle where they were guarded by the East Clare Flying Column. Michael Brennan, Commander of the East Clare Brigade also used the castle as his headquarters during that time.

In 1927, Knappogue demesne was purchased by the Irish Land Commission and the castle became the possession of the Quinn family. The castle and lands were then purchased in 1966 by Mark Edwin Andrews, former Assistant Secretary of the United States Navy, from Houston, Texas. He and his wife Lavonne (a prominent American architect), in collaboration with what was then Shannon Free Airport Development Company (today Shannon Heritage) and Bord Fáilte Éireann carried out an extensive restoration around 1969. This was intended to accommodate use of the castle as restaurant and private residence.

Their work returned much of the castle to its former 15th century state while encompassing and retaining later additions that chronicle the continuous occupation of the castle. The Andrews later leased part of the castle to the Irish Government as a cultural and tourist facility for a nominal rent.

== Today ==
Shannon Development purchased the castle in 1996. Today, the castle is used as a venue for weddings and medieval banquets and offers guided tours.

Dating from 1817, the 1.248-acre (0.505 ha) garden is now restored to its former state. The walls of the garden have been refurnished with climbing roses, grapevines and many varieties of clematis.

There is also a whiskey named "Knappogue Castle" produced by the Castle Brands company, currently bottling liquor produced by Bushmills.
