= Redbreast (whiskey) =

Irish whiskey

- Type: Single pot still whiskey
- Manufacturer: Irish Distillers (Pernod Ricard)
- Origin: Ireland County Cork
- Introduced: Circa. 1903
- Alcohol by volume: 40%-57.2%
- Variants: 12-year-old, 12-year-old cask strength, 15-year-old, 21-year-old, 27-year-old
- Website: www.redbreastwhiskey.com

Redbreast is a brand of single pot still Irish Whiskey produced by the Irish Distillers subsidiary of Pernod Ricard. It was originally bottled by Gilbey's, a Dublin spirits merchant, using distillate sourced from Jameson's Bow Street Distillery. In the 1980s, the brand was purchased by Irish Distillers, the producer of Jameson. It is the largest-selling single pot still Irish whiskey in the world.

As of 2023, there are seven expressions generally available:

- Redbreast 12 Year Old
- Redbreast 12 Cask Strength
- Redbreast Lustau Edition, matured for its final year in Bodegas Lustau sherry casks (part of the Iberian Series)
- Redbreast Kentucky Oak Edition
- Redbreast 15 Year Old
- Redbreast 21 Year Old
- Redbreast 27 Year Old, matured in Ruby Port pipes

== History ==
W&A Gilbey was founded in London in 1857. By 1861, the company had opened a branch on what is now O'Connell Street in Dublin. At the time, it was customary for distilleries to sell distillate to wine merchants or "bonders", who had ample supplies of casks through the importation of fortified wines and would mature the whiskey themselves under bond. By the 1870s, Gilbey's – described as a "wine importer and distiller" at the time – had more than 300,000 gallons of whiskey from Dublin distilleries in stock under bond and sold whiskey to consumers under its own labels. These whiskeys were aged at least six years in Gilbey's own sherry casks at its bonded warehouses on Dublin's Harcourt Street.

By 1903, a whiskey known as John Jameson & Sons Castle "JJ Liqueur" Whiskey 12 Year Old was marketed in a bottle of similar shape and markings to those used for subsequent bottlings of Redbreast. This whiskey was produced using distillate sourced from the Bow Street Distillery in Dublin, the home of Jameson whiskey. Although this whiskey was likely the forerunner of Redbreast, the first official mention of "Redbreast" only dates back to 1912, when Gilbey's referred to the sale of "Redbreast" J.J. Liqueur Whiskey 12 Year Old. "Redbreast" was a nickname given to one of the whiskies by Gilbey's chairman at the time, who was an avid birdwatcher, in reference to Robin Redbreast.

In 1968, Irish Distillers opted to phase out the supply of bonded whiskey to merchants such as Gilbey's. This threatened the future of the whiskey brand, as Irish Distillers controlled all the whiskey distilleries in operation in Ireland at that point. However, following pleas from Gilbey's, Irish Distillers agreed to continue to supply distillate for the production of Redbreast.

In 1971, Irish Distillers closed all its Dublin distilleries (including Bow Street) and consolidated production at the New Midleton Distillery, a purpose-built facility in County Cork. As a result, production of Redbreast whiskey moved from Dublin to Cork.

In 1985, Gilbey's ceased production of Redbreast. It entered into an agreement to sell the brand to Irish Distillers in 1986, and the brand was subsequently relaunched in 1991 after several years of absence from the market. Initially launched as a standalone 12 year old, Redbreast has since been released in 15 year old, 21 year old, and other variants.

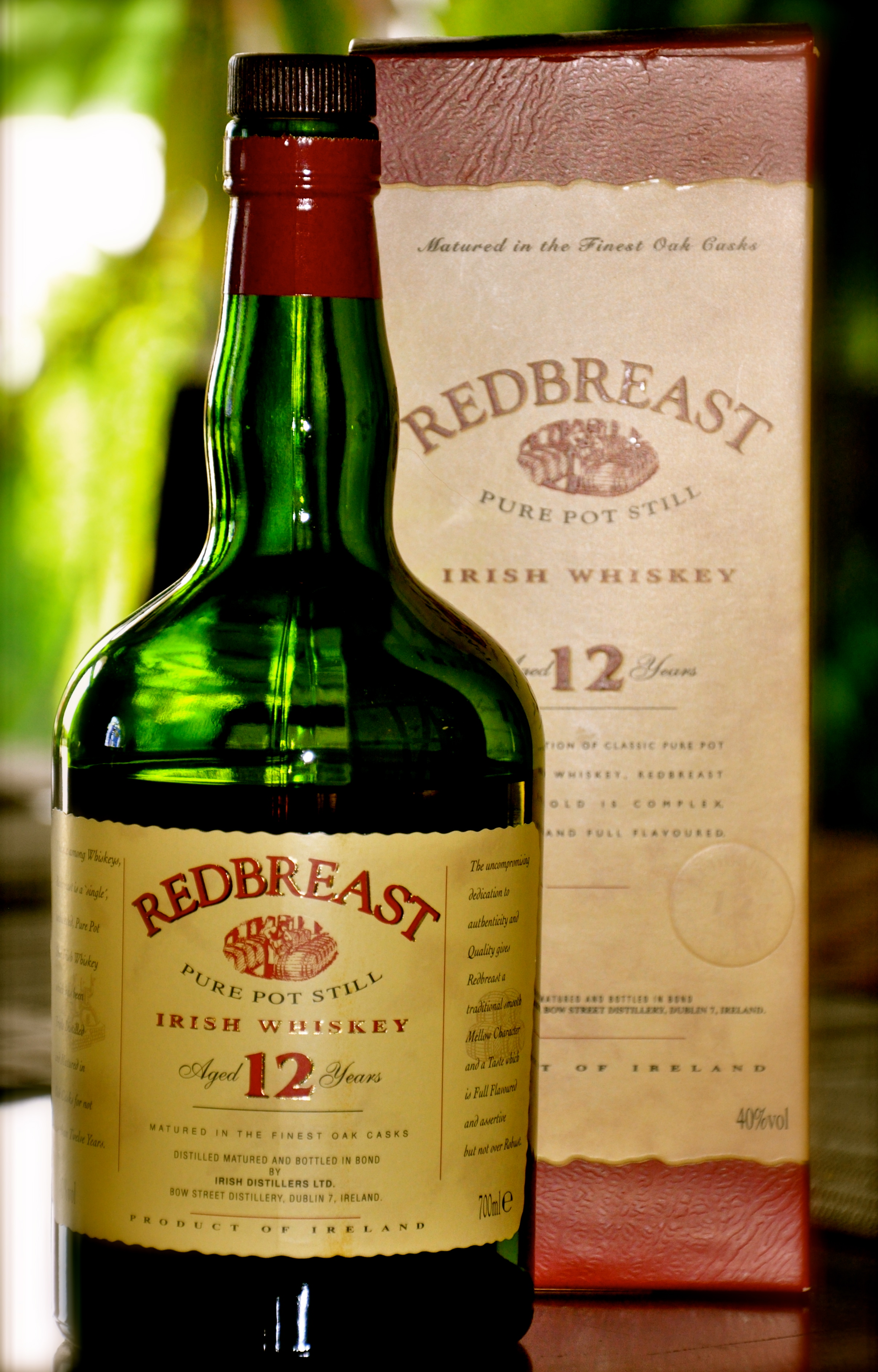
Bottle of 12-year old Redbreast

== Bottlings ==
Initially relaunched in 1991 as a 12 year old, several variants have been marketed in recent years, including:

- Redbreast 12 Year Old, 40% ABV (In South Africa ABV is 46% to comply with South African regulations), aged in Oloroso sherry casks and some ex-Bourbon barrels
- Redbreast Lustau Edition, 46% ABV, aged for 9 to 12 years in traditional Bourbon and sherry casks before being finished for one year in first fill sherry butts seasoned with Bodegas Lustau sherry
- Redbreast PX Edition, 46% ABV, the first outing of the Iberian Series, a collaboration with Pedro Ximenez
- Redbreast 12 Year Old with Project Wingman Bird Feeder, aged 12 years. Comes in a copper "cage" around the bottle that can be taken off and used as a bird feeder. The distillers are also giving €3 of each sale to Birdlife International in protecting birds.
- Redbreast 12 Year Old Cask Strength, 57.2% ABV, aged in first fill Oloroso sherry casks and non-chill filtered First released in 2011
- Redbreast 15 Year Old, 46% ABV, aged in Oloroso sherry and Bourbon casks
- Redbreast 19 Year Old 1998 (La Maison du Whisky), 55.7% ABV, distilled in march of 1998, matured in an Oloroso sherry cask and then bottled by French specialist La Maison Du Whisky. Only 648 bottles released
- Redbreast 21 Year Old, 46% ABV, aged in ex-bourbon and first fill Oloroso sherry casks First released in 2013
- Redbreast 27 Year Old, 54.6% ABV, aged in ex-ruby port casks

Limited editions that are no longer in production but potentially still available through specialist retailers (as of 2016) include:

- Redbreast Mano a Lámh, 46% ABV, aged solely in ex-Oloroso sherry butts and non-chill filtered
- Redbreast 12 Year Old 1970s, 40% ABV, a rare version bottled in the 1970s
- Redbreast 1999 Single Cask, 58.5% ABV, aged in sherry casks, the first single cask Redbreast release
- Redbreast 12 Year Old Gilbeys 1/2 Bottle, 40% ABV, a rare version likely bottled in the 1960s
- Redbreast 20 Year Old 1999 All Sherry (Midleton & Bow St), 60.3% ABV. Originally bottled exclusively for Midleton and Bow St. Distilleries. matured in single sherry cask selected by master blender Billy Leighton. Only 552 bottle released.
- Redbreast Tawny Port Cask, 46% ABV, matured in a combination of bourbon and oloroso sherry casks and then finished in Tawny Port casks for a number of years. All whiskey is then finished in freshly seasoned tawny port hogsheads for a final period of 14–25 months.

== Accolades ==
The Redbreast whiskey variations have won several awards in recent years.

- 2019, Gold Medal San Francisco World Spirits Competition.
- 2019, Winner Ultimate Spirits Challenge.
- 2018, Gold Medal International Wine and Spirits Competition.
- In 2007, Redbreast 15 Year Old was named Irish Whiskey of the Year.

In addition, Redbreast 12 Year Old and Redbreast Mano a Lámh were both rated as top-ten whiskey buys in John Hansell's Buyer's Guide.

== Notability ==
Redbreast is one of a handful of single pot still whiskeys in existence today and one of only two to have been produced almost continuously since the early 1900s (the other being Green Spot). Although once the most popular style of whiskey consumed in the world, pot still whiskey fell out of favor in the 20th century, due in part to the rise of cheaper, less intense blended whiskeys. As a result of falling demand, most Irish whiskeys were either reformulated as blends or discontinued.

Single pot still whiskeys, which are historically unique to Ireland, are similar to single malts in that they are produced solely from pot still distillate. However, in contrast to malts which only use malted barley in the mash, single pot still whiskeys are produced from a mixed mash that contains both malted and unmalted barley.

== See also ==
- Green Spot
- Irish whiskey brands
