= Clontarf (whiskey) =

Irish brand, produced in County Cork

Clontarf 1014
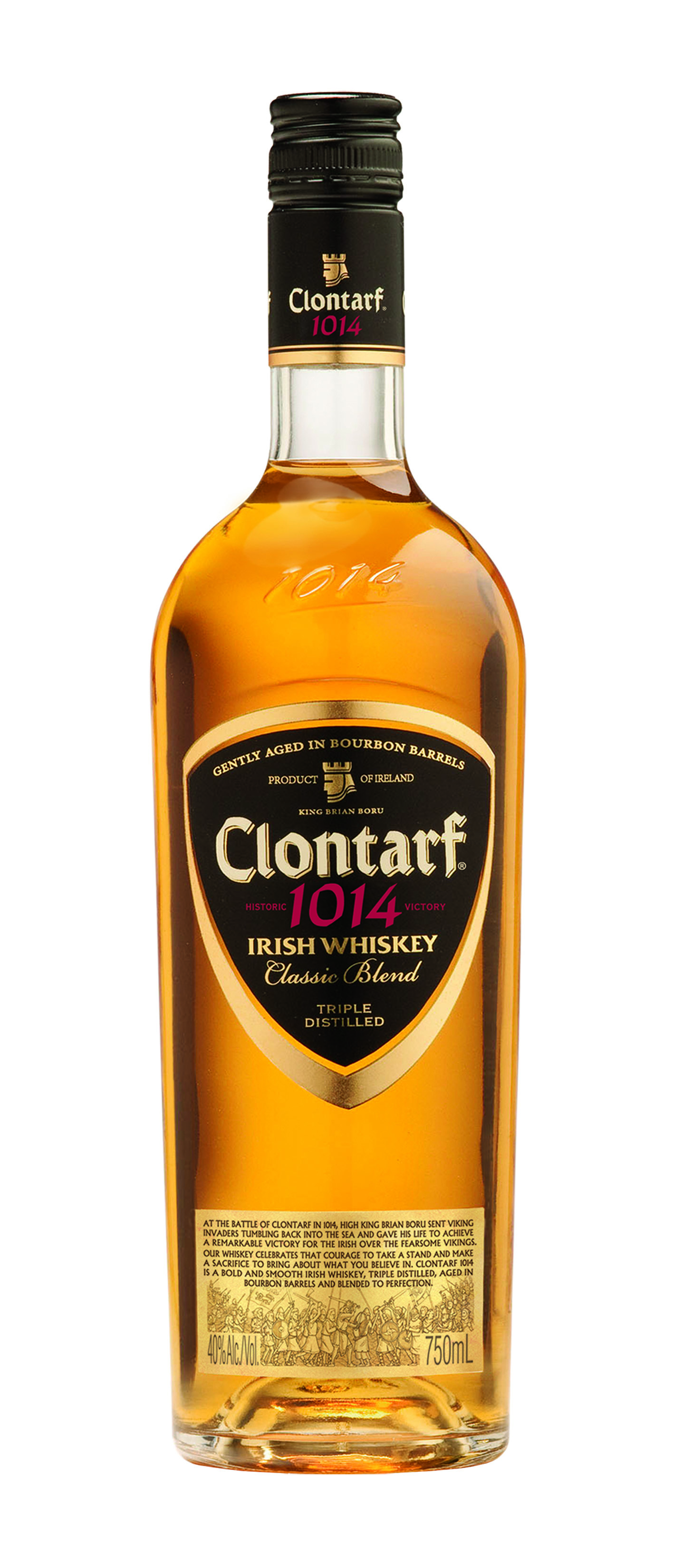
- Clontarf 1014
- Type: Irish Whiskey
- Manufacturer: Irish Distillers (Pernod Ricard)
- Origin: Dublin, Ireland
- Alcohol by volume: 40%
- Colour: Amber
- Variants: Classic Blend, Reserve
- Website: Clontarf 1014

Clontarf 1014 is a triple distilled Irish whiskey produced by the Irish Distillers subsidiary of Pernod Ricard. Originally called "Clontarf," the whiskey takes its name from the Battle of Clontarf in 1014 in which Brian Boru, the High King of Ireland, defeated an army of Vikings.

The brand has launched several marketing initiatives, including one in 2008 and most recently in 2011, when new packaging was released to highlight the 1000 year anniversary of the battle of Clontarf. Clontarf 1014 is 40% abv.

== About ==
Clontarf 1014 is a blended Irish whiskey produced in County Cork, Ireland. It is triple distilled using a combination of grains and aged in bourbon barrels.

Clontarf 1014 also produced a single malt, as well as a reserve that is a blend of single malt and grain whiskey. All three varieties were available in the Clontarf 1014 Trinity Collection. However, only the blended whiskey was available on the American market. The reserve and the single malt were available in select European countries.

In 2021, Clontarf was bought by Irish Distillers, a subsidiary of Pernod Ricard.

== Reviews ==
The Clontarf 1014 single malt has generally outperformed its Reserve counterpart at international spirit ratings competitions. The single malt received a score of 85-89 from Wine Enthusiast in 2005 (vs. 80-84 for the Reserve). In the same time period, the single malt received a gold medal from the San Francisco World Spirits Competition, besting the silver medal earned by the Reserve.

In 2008, Clontarf 1014 Irish Whiskey received a 90 rating from the Beverage Tasting Institute, as well as a “Best Buy” award. It was described as “as spot on Irish blend with a lot of character”.

== See also ==
- Irish whiskey brands
