= Porterhouse Brewery =

Brewery, distillery and bar chain

Porterhouse Brewing Company
- Porterhouse logo
- Industry: Brewing, public houses, restaurants
- Founded: 1980s
- Headquarters: Dublin, Ireland
- Number of employees: 180 (2022)
- Parent: Porterhouse Group
- Website: https://porterhousebrewco.ie/

The Porterhouse Brewing Company is a brewing company based in Dublin, Ireland. It was founded in 1996 by cousins Oliver Hughes and Liam Lahart who opened Ireland's first craft brew pub in Dublin. The company's brewery is now in Glasnevin, providing beers to its outlets in Dublin, London and New York. It also sells its products via several supermarket chains. It was reported, in 2023, that Conor McGregor had "agreed to buy the Porterhouse Brewery".

== History ==
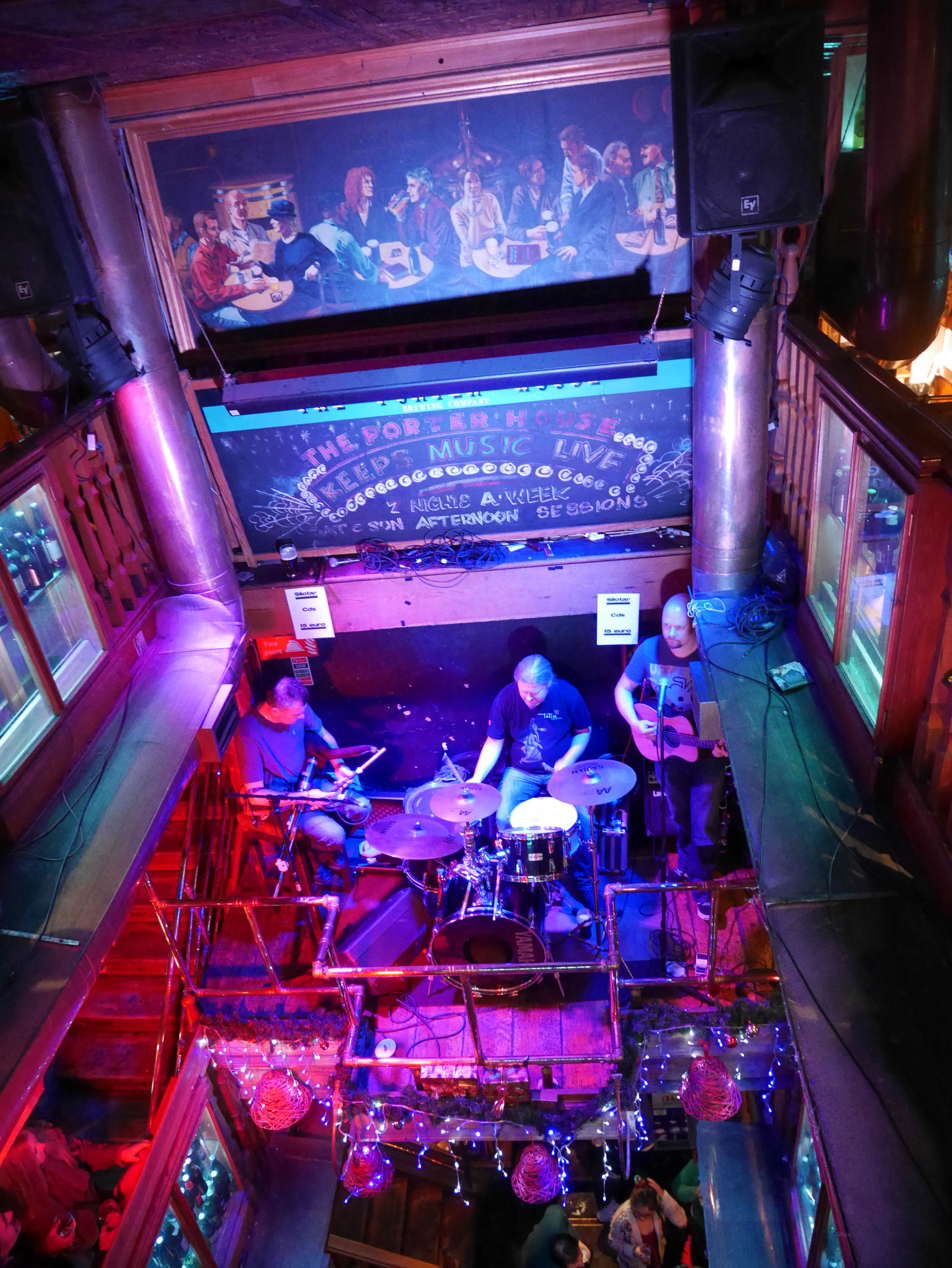
Live music at The Porterhouse, Temple Bar in 2014

While there were over two hundred breweries in Ireland during the 19th century, by the twentieth century the market was largely served by a few large breweries. It was in this environment that, in 1989, Liam Lahart and Oliver Hughes bought a run-down building in Bray, County Wicklow, which became the company's first pub. In 1996, the Porterhouse brewpub was opened in Dublin's Temple Bar area. They opened their next bar in Covent Garden London in 2000. They opened Porterhouse North in Glasnevin, Dublin in 2004, and the group purchased another property in Dublin city centre in 2004. In January 2011, they opened a premises on Pearl Street in Manhattan, New York, trading at Fraunces Tavern. The original bar in Bray, was sold in February 2019.

As of 2021, the company reportedly had between 280 and 300 employees, declining to 180 by early 2022. As of late 2022, the company's website listed four bars: two in Dublin (in Temple Bar and Nassau Street), one in London and one in New York.

In April 2023, a report in the Irish Independent indicated that Irish MMA star Conor McGregor had "agreed to buy the Porterhouse Brewery in Dublin".

== Beers ==
The Porterhouse Brewery's beers, mainly draught beers which are filtered and kegged, include:

- Wrasslers 4X Stout, a 5.7% abv stout claimed to be made to a recipe originally brewed by Deasy's of West Cork in the early 1900s;
- Oyster Stout, 5.2% abv;
- Plain Porter, 5% abv; Winner of the gold medal at the Brewing Industry International Awards for the best stout in the world in 1998 and again in 2011;
- Turner's Sticklebract Bitter (TSB), a 3.7% abv session bitter first brewed in July 2000 to celebrate the opening of The Porterhouse in Covent Garden, London;
- Porterhouse Red, a 4.4% abv Irish red ale;
- An Brain Blasta, a 7% abv strong ale;
- Hersbrucker, a 5% abv pale lager;
- Temple Bräu, a 4.3% abv pale lager;
- Chiller, a 4.2% abv pale lager;
- Hop Head, a 5% abv pale ale.

In 2009, the brewery launched a range of bottled versions of its beers. During the 2020 COVID-19 "lockdown" in Ireland, they released an IPA called "Stay Home Isolation IPA".

== Pubs ==
In order of opening date, pubs operated by the group have included:

- The Porterhouse Inn, Strand Road, Bray, County Wicklow (1989); The original Porterhouse, which opened in 1989, was sold in February 2019.
- The Porterhouse, Parliament Street, Temple Bar, Dublin (opened 1996)
- The Porterhouse, Covent Garden, London (opened 2000)
- The Porterhouse North, Cross Guns Bridge, Glasnevin (2004; rebranded in 2016 as "The Whitworth", and subsequently sold)
- The Porterhouse Central, Nassau Street, Dublin (acquired 2004; rebranded in 2022 as "Tapped")
- The Porterhouse at Fraunces Tavern, Pearl Street, New York (2011)

The group's brewery is located in the Glasnevin area of Dublin.

== Other businesses ==
Other businesses, operated by the Porterhouse Group, include a chain of tapas bars which, as of 2021, had four locations in the Dublin area (South William Street, Temple Bar, Camden Street and Dundrum) and one in London. It also owned the Lillie's Bordello nightclub.

In 2011, Porterhouse announced a desire to build a distillery in Dingle, County Kerry. The distillery opened in 2012 trading as Dingle Distillery, part of the Porterhouse Group.
