= Midleton Library =

Municipal building in Midleton, County Cork, Ireland

- Leabharlann Mainistir na Corann
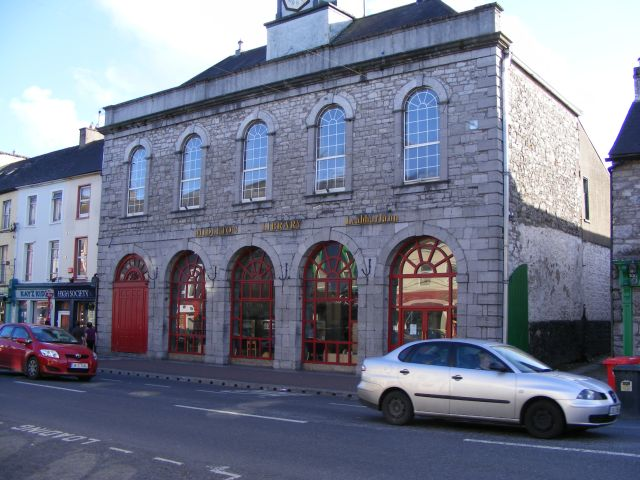
- Midleton Library

- Location within County Cork

General information
- Architectural style: Italianate style
- Location: Main Street, Midleton, Ireland
- Coordinates: 51.9140°N 8.1729°W
- Completed: 1789

Design and construction
- Architect: John Morrison

Midleton Library (Irish: Leabharlann Mainistir na Corann), formerly Midleton Town Hall (Irish: Halla an Bhaile Mainistir na Corann), is a municipal building in Main Street, Midleton, County Cork, Ireland. The building, which was used as the market house and town hall throughout most of its life, is now used as a public library. It is included in Cork County Council's Record of Protected Structures.

== History ==
The building in its original form was commissioned by Sir St John Brodrick of Ballyannan who was granted rights as lord of the manor of the Ballyannan Estate to the southwest of Midleton in 1670. It was complete by the time of the publication of Sir William Petty's county map, Hiberniae Delineatio, in 1685 and was enhanced by a clock in around 1750. After it became dilapidated, George Brodrick, 4th Viscount Midleton invited proposals for the rebuilding of the structure in the early 1780s.

The new structure was designed by John Morrison in the Italianate style, built in rough limestone and was completed in 1789. The design involved a symmetrical main frontage of five bays facing onto Main Street. The building was arcaded, so that markets could be held, with meeting rooms on the first floor. There were five openings with imposts, voussoirs and keystones on the ground floor and round headed windows with architraves and keystones on the first floor. At roof level, there was a parapet and a central two-stage cupola, with clock faces in the first stage and a belfry in the second stage and an ogee-shaped dome and a weather vane above. Internally, the principal rooms were a shambles, a weigh-house and a market hall on the ground floor and an assembly room and council chamber for the use of Midleton Corporation on the first floor.

The corporation was abolished under the Municipal Corporations (Ireland) Act 1840. Soldiers from the 14th Regiment of Foot were billeted in the building, in the aftermath of the Fenian Rising in East Cork which began in Midleton on Skellig Night in March 1867.

After Midleton Urban District Council, formed in 1900, started to use the building as a town hall, a town clerk's office was established at 45 Main Street, on the directly opposite side of the road. The market house also eventually became the home of the local library. An extensive programme of refurbishment works to restore the fabric of the building to its original condition was completed in 2008.

== See also ==
- List of libraries in the Republic of Ireland
