= Single pot still whiskey =

Style of Irish whiskey

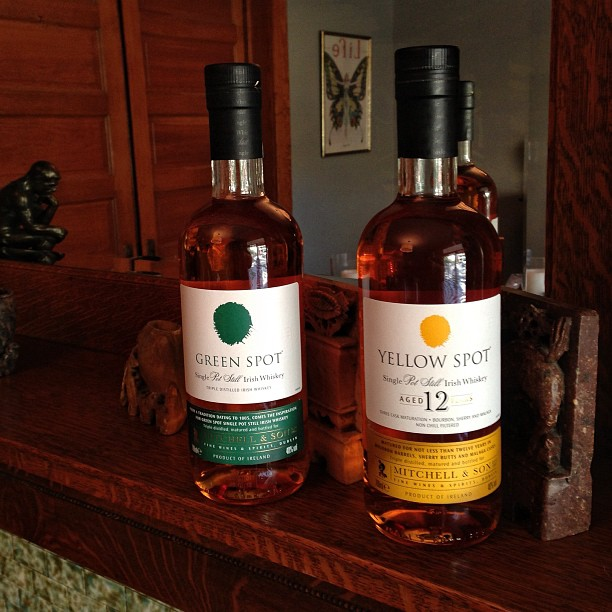
- Type: Whiskey
- Origin: Ireland
- Alcohol by volume: Minimum 40%
- Colour: Pale Gold to Dark Amber

Single pot still whiskey is a style of Irish whiskey made by a single distillery from a mixed mash of malted and unmalted barley distilled in a pot still. Somewhat similar to single malt whiskey, the style is defined by its inclusion of unmalted raw barley in the mash in addition to malt. However, small amounts of other grains such as oats, rye or wheat may have been used at times. This unmalted component is said to give the pot still whiskey a "spicier bristle" and "thicker texture" than the otherwise similar malt whiskeys. If the whiskey is not distilled completely on the site of a single distillery, then it may be termed pot still whiskey but not single pot still whiskey.

Once the most popular type of whiskey in the world, this style of whiskey was historically referred to as pure pot still whiskey, Irish-style pot still whiskey, or – especially in Ireland – simply pot still whiskey. Whiskeys that are likewise made solely in a pot still but not formally called single pot still whiskey due to differences in mash bill include single malt whiskeys as well as some bourbons and rye whiskeys.

== Science of pot still distillation ==
To separate components from a mixture of liquids, the liquid can be heated to force components, which have different boiling points, into the gas phase. The wash is poured into a still, usually made of copper, and heated using steam. The wash consists of many chemicals, malted barley, alcohol, water, and sugar. The alcohol, along with some other chemicals, needs to be separated. By using steam to heat the still, alcohol and some volatile chemicals are evaporated first. As the gas travels upwards, it is directed into another tube around which cold water is constantly flowing. After the gas travels through the cold tube, the gas is condensed back into a liquid and collected in a separate vessel. Depending on how the wash is turned in the still, different chemicals (aldehydes, esters, higher alcohols, and a number of other substances in very small amounts) are evaporated. During the heating process, kinetic energy increases (molecules move faster) until they start to change phases. Then entropy increases from the phase change. In the cooling pipe, kinetic energy and entropy both decrease resulting in another phase change from gas to liquid. In this process, not all of the solids are removed and some make it through the first distillation process.

== History ==
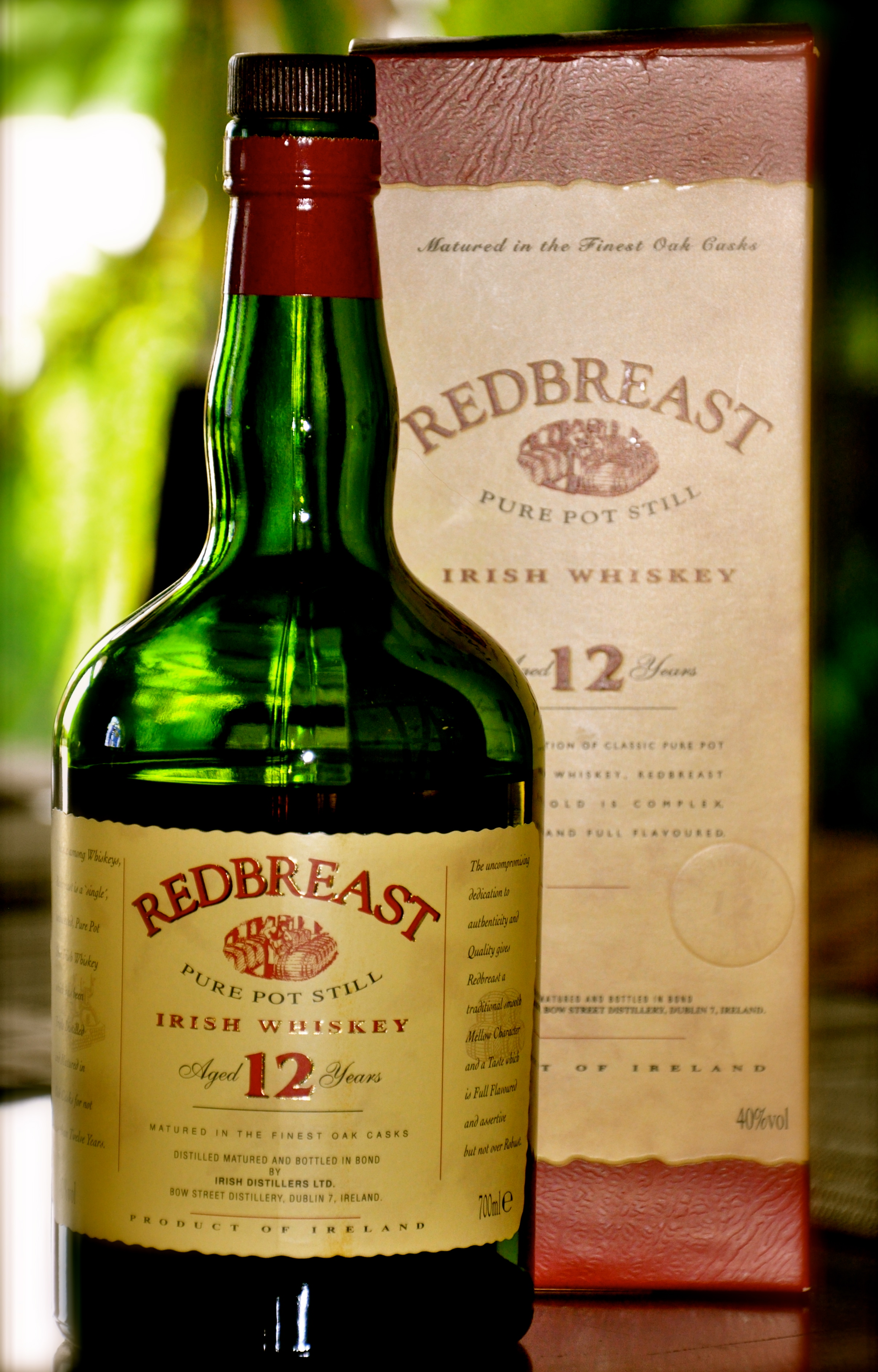
A bottle of Redbreast 12 Year Old, bearing the older description "Pure pot still". Newer bottles are labelled "Single pot still".

Whiskey has been distilled in Ireland since at least the 1400s and most likely as early as the 6th century. Single pot still whiskey emerged as a means of avoiding a tax introduced in 1785 on the use of malted barley. Although this tax was repealed in 1855, the popularity of the style endured until the emergence of blends in the late 19th and early 20th centuries.

In the 19th century, single pot still whiskey was the most popular style of whiskey in the world and formed the bulk of Ireland's whiskey exports. However, with the rise of cheaper, milder blended whiskeys in the 20th century, single pot still whiskey declined in popularity, and many formerly all-pot-still brands such as Jameson's changing their production to become blends. By 1980, only two specialist bottlings remained in existence, Green Spot and Redbreast, both distilled at Midleton Distillery in Co. Cork. However, in recent years, a resurgence in whiskey distilling in Ireland has led to the launch of several new single pot still whiskeys.

== Legal definition ==
In addition to the general regulations governing the production of Irish whiskey (e.g., geographical origin, aging in wooden casks for a minimum of three years), Irish government regulations stipulate that Irish pot still whiskey must be:

- Distilled from a mash of a combination of malted barley, unmalted barley, and other unmalted cereals
- Distilled in a pot still so that the distillate has the aroma and taste of the materials used
- Made with a minimum of 30% malted barley and 30% unmalted barley

In addition, the regulation documents state that:

- Up to 5% of cereals other than malted and unmalted barley, such as oats and rye, may be used
- Either double or triple distillation may be used, although traditionally most Irish pot still whiskey is triple distilled
- The term "single" can be added if the Irish pot still whiskey is distilled on the site of a single distillery

== Irish single pot still whiskeys ==
There is an increasing number of single pot still whiskeys on the market. As new distilleries have opened in Ireland in recent years, several more single pot whiskeys are expected to be released. Those available include:

- Dingle Single Pot Still (released in late 2017), Co. Kerry
- Green Spot, Yellow Spot, and Red Spot (distilled at Midleton, Co. Cork)
- Midleton (Barry Crockett Legacy, Dair Ghaelach) Co. Cork
- Powers (Three Swallows, Signature Release, John's Lane) (distilled at Midleton, Co. Cork)
- Redbreast (12, 12 Cask Strength, 15, 21, Lustau Edition) (distilled at Midleton, Co. Cork)
- Teeling Single Pot Still (released in August 2018), Co. Dublin
- Drumshanbo Single Pot Still, Co. Leitrim
- Micil Whiskey, Co. Galway
- Old Comber Single Pot Still, Co. Down

== Single pot still whiskey outside Ireland ==
While the term "single pot still" (SPS) whiskey is legally defined in Ireland, the recent resurgence in popularity has led some distilleries outside Ireland to adopt similar production methods, creating whiskeys that emulate the Irish style. Depending on local regulations, these products are sometimes labeled as single pot still whiskey, and sometimes simply labelled whiskey.

These distilleries have embraced these similar production techniques, contributing to the global appreciation of this distinctive style.

- Macaloney's Island Distillery (British Columbia, Canada)
- Talnua Distillery (Colorado, USA)
- Tara Distillery (New South Wales, Australia)
- Hunter Island Whiskey (Tasmania, Australia)
- Transportation Whiskey (Tasmania, Australia)
- Kanosuke Distillery (Hioki, Japan)
