= Bow Street, Dublin =

Street in Dublin, Ireland

Bow Street
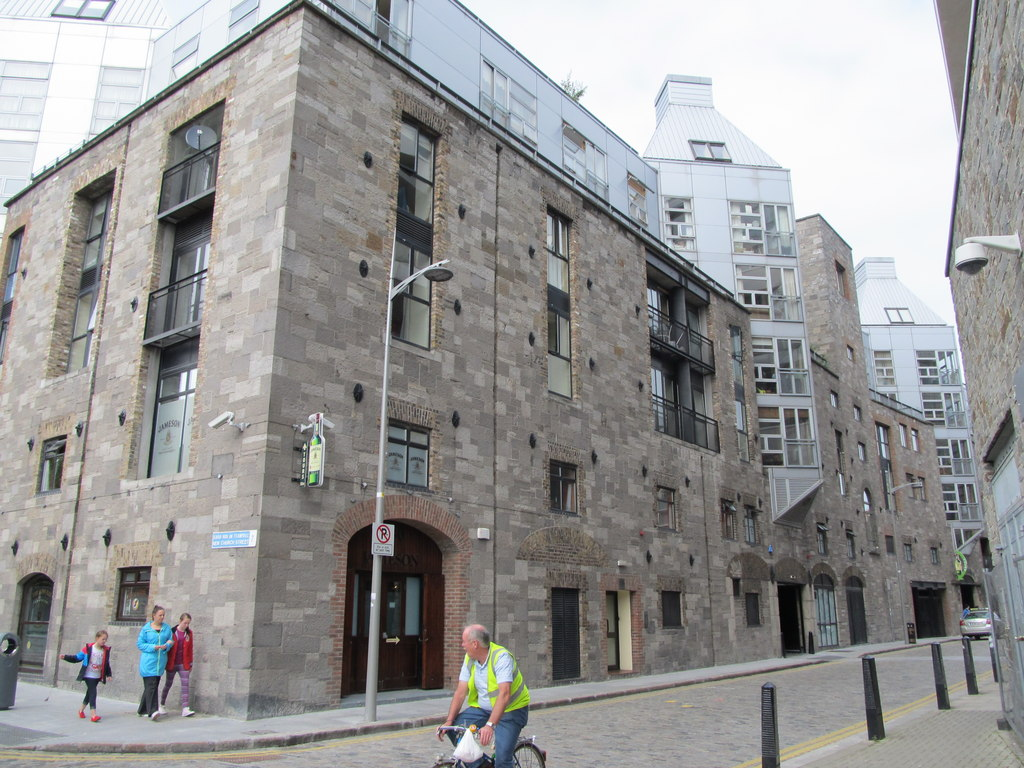
- Interactive map of Bow Street
- Native name: Sráid Bowes (Irish)
- Former name: Bowes Street
- Namesake: John Bowes, 1st Baron Bowes
- Location: Dublin, Ireland
- Postal code: D07
- Coordinates: 53°20′53″N 6°16′34″W
- south end: Lincoln Lane
- north end: North King Street

Bow Street (Irish: Sráid Bowes) is a street in Dublin which connects North King Street to the north and Lincoln Lane to the south.

== History ==
Originally named Bowes Street for the Lord Chancellor of Ireland, John Bowes, 1st Baron Bowes, who lived on the street. His house was later known as the "Night Asylum". The street was historically part of the Slíghe Mhidhluachra, one of the four ancient routes that met in Dublin.

Bow Street is now known as the location of the Jameson Distillery, a former distillery now tourist attraction, which dates back to 1780. The distillery and the street now form part of the wider regenerated Smithfield area. Also on the street is the film and television acting academy, Bow Street Academy.
