= John Bowes, 1st Baron Bowes =

Anglo-Irish peer, politician and judge

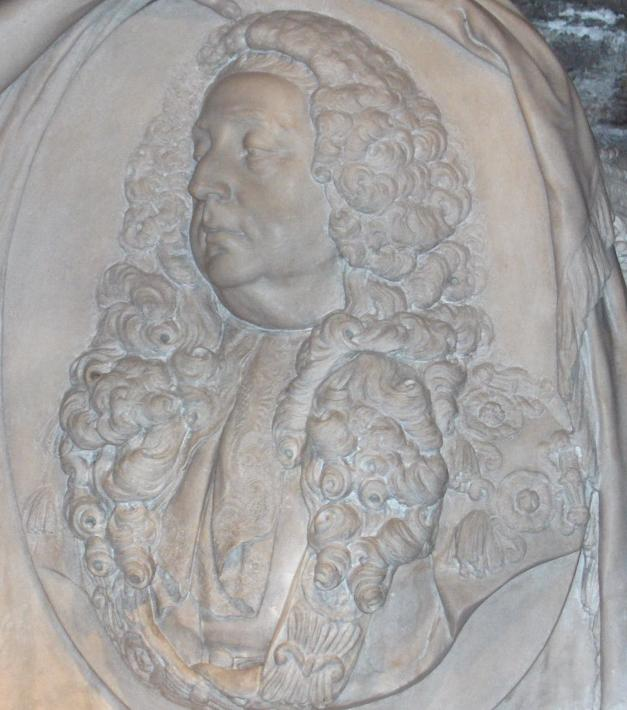
Bust of John Bowes in the crypt of Christ Church Cathedral, Dublin, by John van Nost the younger.

John Bowes, 1st Baron Bowes PC (I) (1691 – 22 July 1767) was an Anglo-Irish peer, politician and judge. He was noted for his great legal ability, but also for his implacable hostility to Roman Catholics.

== Life ==
He was born in London, the second son of Thomas Bowes, a merchant and member of the Worshipful Company of Turners, and his wife, a Miss North, and was called to the Bar in 1712. He came to Ireland as a member of the staff of Richard West, the Lord Chancellor of Ireland, in 1723. He built up a large practice at the Irish Bar and was appointed Solicitor-General for Ireland in 1730, and Attorney-General in 1739. He was raised to the Bench as Lord Chief Baron of the Irish Exchequer in 1741, having previously failed to become third Baron (which was a surprisingly lucrative office, as the Baron received several extra fees). He was appointed Lord Chancellor of Ireland by King George II in 1757, despite the chronic ill-health which afflicted him. In his last years, his legs were so swollen that he could scarcely walk.

== Hostility to Catholics ==
John Bowes epitomized the severity of the 18th century Penal Laws against Irish Catholics when he ruled, in about 1759, that: "The law does not suppose any such person to exist as an Irish Roman Catholic, nor could such a person draw breath without the Crown's permission". Such views, given that Roman Catholics made up more than 90% of the Irish population, inevitably made him bitterly unpopular, and in 1760 he was assaulted during a riot outside the House of Commons.

== Achievements ==
In spite of his religious bigotry, he was considered one of the outstanding judges of his time. In particular, he was a reforming Lord Chancellor, who was praised for making the Court of Chancery "a terror for fraud, and a comfort and protection for honest men". As Attorney General he showed considerable courage in going on assize during the Irish Famine (1740–1741) despite the infectious fever which was raging at the time, and which claimed the lives of three other judges who had decided to brave the dangers.

Between 1731 and 1742, he represented Taghmon in the Irish House of Commons.

He was considered one of the finest speakers of his time; his speech for the prosecution at the trial of Lord Santry, who was charged with murder in 1739, was described by those who heard it as a masterpiece of eloquence and logic, and led to the Irish House of Lords bringing in a unanimous verdict of guilty against Santry.

He was raised to the peerage of Ireland in 1758 as Baron Bowes, of Clonlyon in the County of Meath.

== Death ==
He died in Dublin on 22 July 1767, his mental faculties fully intact despite his bodily infirmities, and was buried in Christ Church Cathedral, Dublin, where his brother raised a memorial to him. He never married, and his title became extinct on his death.

He lived for a period at Belvidere House, Drumcondra. His estates passed to his brother Rumsey Bowes of Binfield, Berkshire. He also had a residence for a period at 24 Chancery Lane, Dublin which was later referred to as chancellor's house. He also lived on the street now known as Bow Street, originally Bowes Street, and named in his honour.

Parliament of Ireland
Preceded by Richard Saunders; William Hore	Member of Parliament for Taghmon; 1731–1742; With: William Hore	Succeeded by Charles Gardiner; William Hore
Legal offices
Preceded by Robert Jocelyn	Solicitor-General for Ireland; 1730–1739	Succeeded by St George Caulfeild
Preceded by Robert Jocelyn	Attorney-General for Ireland; 1739–1741	Succeeded by St George Caulfeild
Preceded by Thomas Marlay	Lord Chief Baron of the Irish Exchequer; 1741–1757	Succeeded by Edward Willes
Preceded by The Viscount Jocelyn	Lord Chancellor of Ireland; 1757–1767	Succeeded by James Hewitt
Peerage of Ireland
New creation	Baron Bowes; 1758–1767	Extinct
