= New Midleton Distillery =

Distillery in County Cork, Ireland

Coordinates: 51.913110°N 8.169485°W

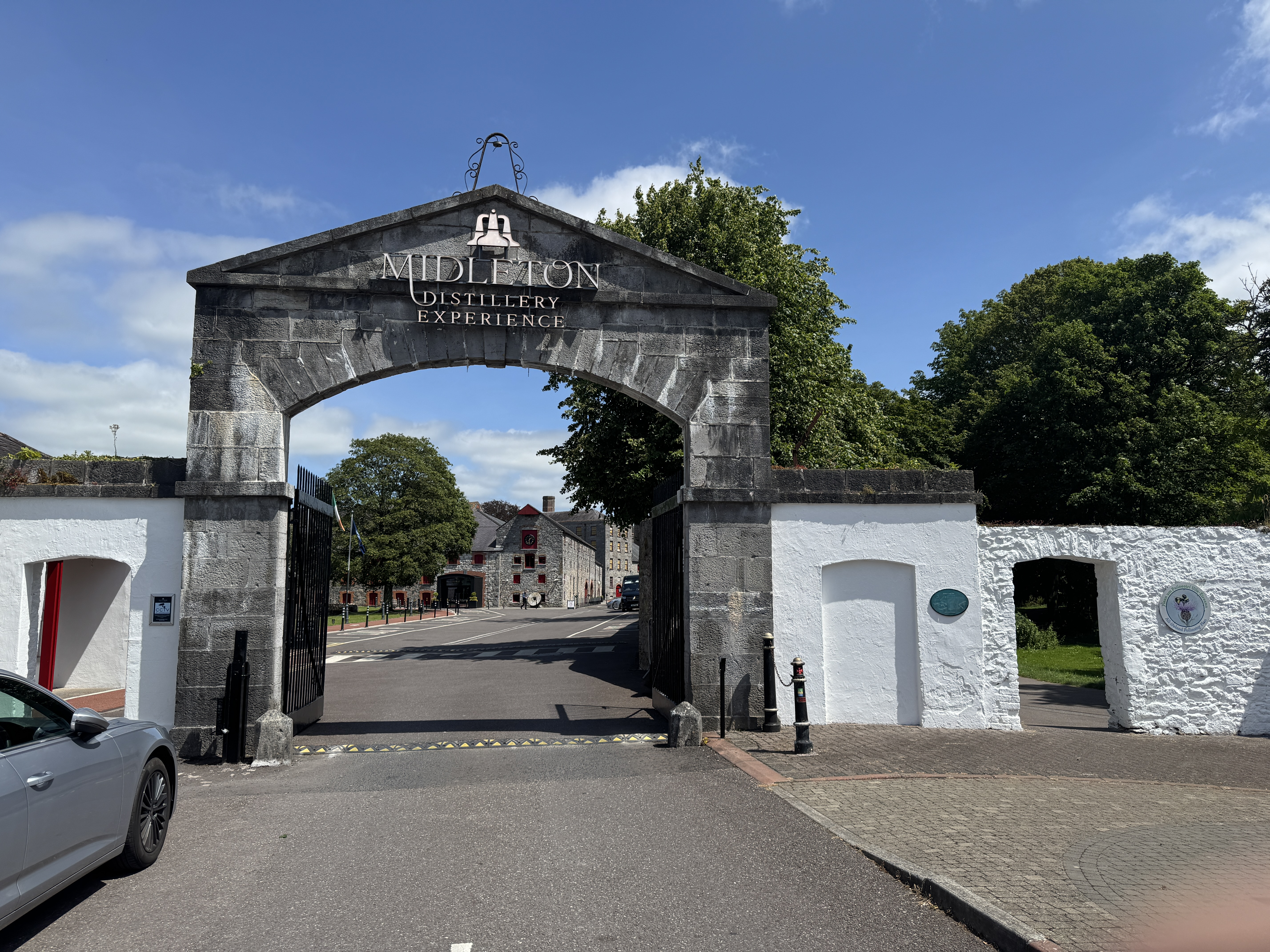
- Distillery entrance in 2026
- Location: Midleton, County Cork, Ireland
- Owner: Irish Distillers (Pernod Ricard)
- Founded: 1975
- Status: Operating
- Water source: Dungourney River
- No. of stills: 3 pot stills and 3 column stills,
- Capacity: 64,000,000 L
- Website: https://www.jamesonwhiskey.com/

New Midleton Distillery is situated in Midleton, County Cork, Ireland. Established in 1975 and owned by Irish Distillers, a subsidiary of Pernod Ricard. Located alongside is the Old Midleton Distillery, which was established in the early 17th century and now operates as a visitor centre known as the Jameson Experience.

== History ==
In 1966, John Power & Son, John Jameson & Son and the Cork Distilleries Company (which owned the Old Midleton distillery) merged to form the Irish Distillers Group. The board of the newly formed company decided to close their existing distilleries and consolidate all production at a new facility. This was built at Midleton as it was the only existing site with room for expansion. In July 1975, production ended at The Old Jameson Distillery and began in the new one. The old distillery has since been turned into a visitor centre. Since 2010, the distillery has expanded vastly, with Irish Distillers investing over €200 million to double the capacity of the plant and build a new maturing facility in Dungourney, a nearby village.

== Production ==
Midleton is one of the most modern distilleries in the world and has its production areas linked via fibre-optic networks. The distillery boasts three 75,000 litre pot stills (the largest currently in operation worldwide), and three column stills, which are used in combination to produce different types of whiskey. With a total production capacity of 64 million litres per annum, the distillery is the largest in Ireland. The distillery also hosts a micro distillery with smaller pot stills, which have the capacity to produce about 50,000 L of alcohol per annum.

== Visitor attractions ==
The New Midleton Distillery is next to the Old Midleton distillery, home of the visitors centre called the Jameson Experience. Like the visitors centre in Dublin at the Old Jameson Distillery, the tour explains the history of Jameson Whiskey. The story is told through a series of reconstructed scenes from the original distillery in Dublin, exhibition areas that show the seven stages of whiskey making, and a video that shows what the distillery was like when the creator John Jameson was alive. Small numbers of visitors can also participate in a taste test between Jameson Whiskey, Scottish whisky, and American whiskey to become a "Qualified Irish Whiskey Taster".

In 2013, a new Irish Whiskey Academy was opened in the Midleton Distillery Grounds offering a range of one to three day Irish whiskey appreciation courses and training for Irish whiskey aficionados, journalists and other members of the drinks profession and industry.

The grounds of the old Midleton Distillery also houses the official historical archives for the Irish Distillers Whiskey labels in the old Master Distillers House.

== Whiskeys produced ==
As a result of the different stills combinations that can be achieved, a range of different products can be produced. The most significant brands produced are:

- Jameson - The best selling Irish whiskey in the world
- Powers
- Paddy
- Redbreast
- Midleton Very Rare In September 2014, Midleton Distillery invited their Master Distiller Emeritus Barry Crockett out of retirement to join his successor Master Distiller Brian Nation in producing a limited expression of just 117 bottles of Midleton Very Rare 30th Anniversary Pearl Edition to commemorate 30 years of Midleton Irish Whiskey.
- Green Spot
- Red Spot
- Yellow Spot
- Blue Spot

== Other products ==
- Cork Dry Gin
- Huzzar Vodka

== See also ==
- Cooley Distillery
- Irish whiskey brands
- Old Bushmills Distillery
