= Emilio Lustau =

Spanish sherry producer

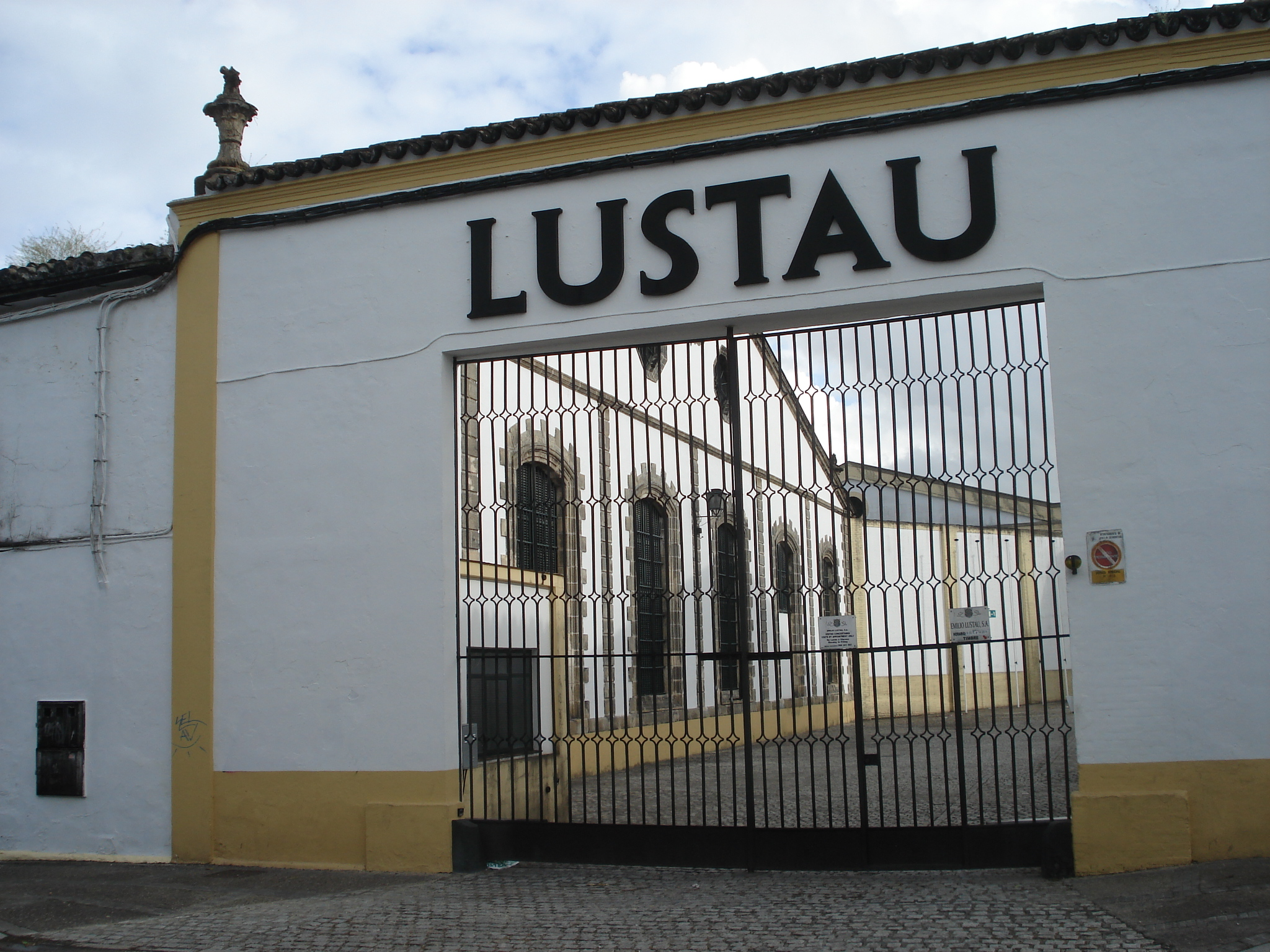
The bodegas

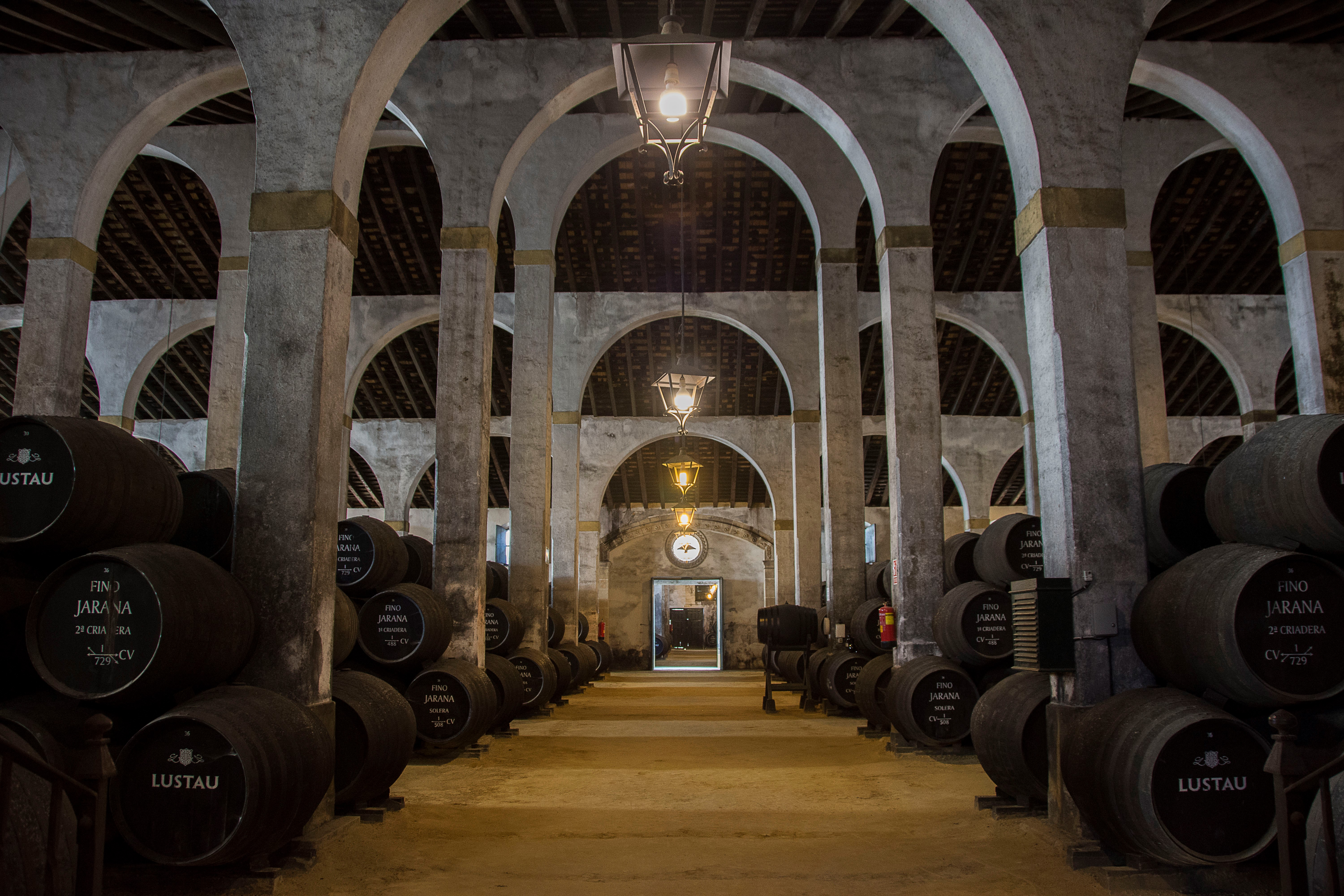
Solera casks

Emilio Lustau is a Spanish sherry producer. The firm is known for its "Almacenista" range of sherries, the products of small family-owned bodegas that it sells as specialist bottlings under its brand name.

== History ==
The winery started in 1896 when José Ruiz-Berdejo cultivated the wines on the family estate, Nuestra Señora de la Esperanza. His daughter, Maria Ruiz-Berdejo Alberti acquired a winery in 1931 and moved production to a site close to the centre of Jerez de la Frontera.

During the 1940s, her husband, Emilio Lustau Ortego moved the winery again into the historic quarter of Jerez de la Frontera and in 1945 began to develop his own brands, rather than sell on the sherry to larger producers.

In 1990 the winery was acquired by Grupo Caballero and this gave added financial investment. In 2000 the business moved into the large bodegas it occupies today on Calle Arcos.
