= Midleton Very Rare =

Premium Irish whiskey

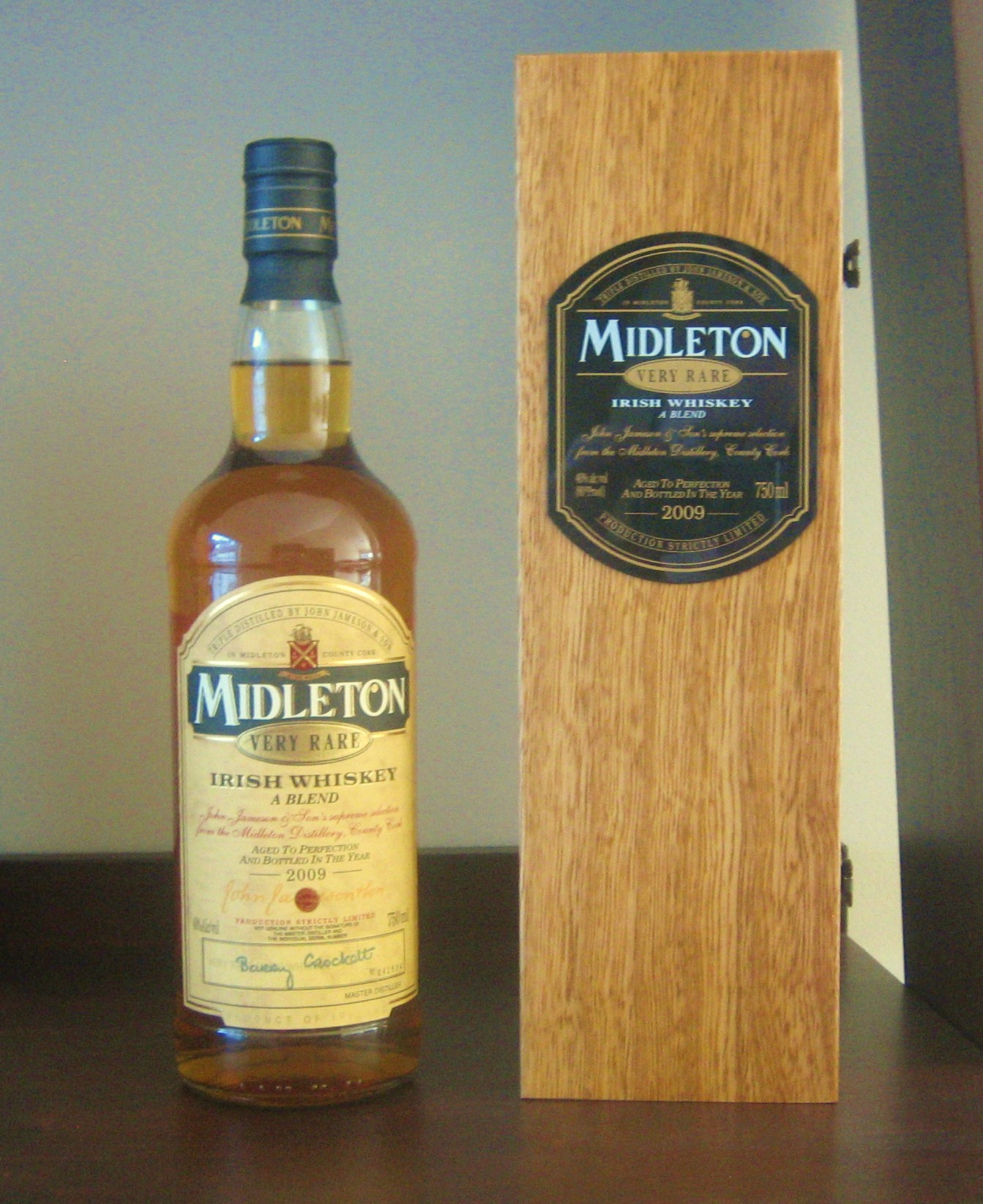
- A bottle of Midleton Very Rare with box
- Type: Irish whiskey
- Manufacturer: Irish Distillers (Pernod Ricard)
- Country of origin: Ireland
- Introduced: 1984
- Alcohol by volume: 40%
- Variants: Midleton 1973 Master Distiller's Private Collection, Midleton Very Rare 30th Anniversary Pearl Edition, Midleton Barry Crockett Legacy, Midleton Dair Ghaelach

Midleton Very Rare is a premium Irish whiskey, produced by the Irish Distillers subsidiary of Pernod Ricard at the New Midleton Distillery, in the East Cork town of Midleton, from which it gets its name. A non-age statement whiskey, containing a mix of pot still and grain whiskeys, it is matured for about twelve to twenty years in ex-bourbon American Oak barrels. One of the most expensive whiskeys regularly produced by Irish Distillers, since its launch in 1984, Midleton Very Rare has frequently been the recipient of strong reviews and awards.

Each year, a new bottling is specially created by the Master Distiller at the Midleton Distillery, using whiskeys handpicked from the distillery's warehouses. Barry Crockett, the Master Distiller who created the whiskey, and oversaw its production until he retired in 2013, stated that his objective each year was "to produce the best whiskey possible". The fact that each vintage differs, and is only released in very limited quantities (typically less than 2,500 cases per annum), makes the whiskey both collectible and expensive.

Each bottle is individually numbered and signed by the Master Distiller, and sold in an accompanying wooden display case.

In recent years several single pot still whiskeys have been released under the Midleton banner alongside Midleton Very Rare.

== History ==
In the mid-1970s, Irish Distillers which owned several distilleries in Ireland, decided to close most of their existing distilleries and to consolidate production at a new purpose-built facility in Midleton. Therefore, as the new distillery needed to replicate several different existing whiskeys it became home to a wide range of maturing whiskey stocks.

In 1984, Midleton Very Rare was launched to celebrate the whiskeys produced in Midleton. As the new distillery had only been open for about a decade at that stage, the initial vintages contained whiskey from the neighbouring Old Midleton Distillery, which closed when the new distillery opened. However, the newer vintages are produced from whiskeys distilled in the new distillery.

== Midleton variants ==
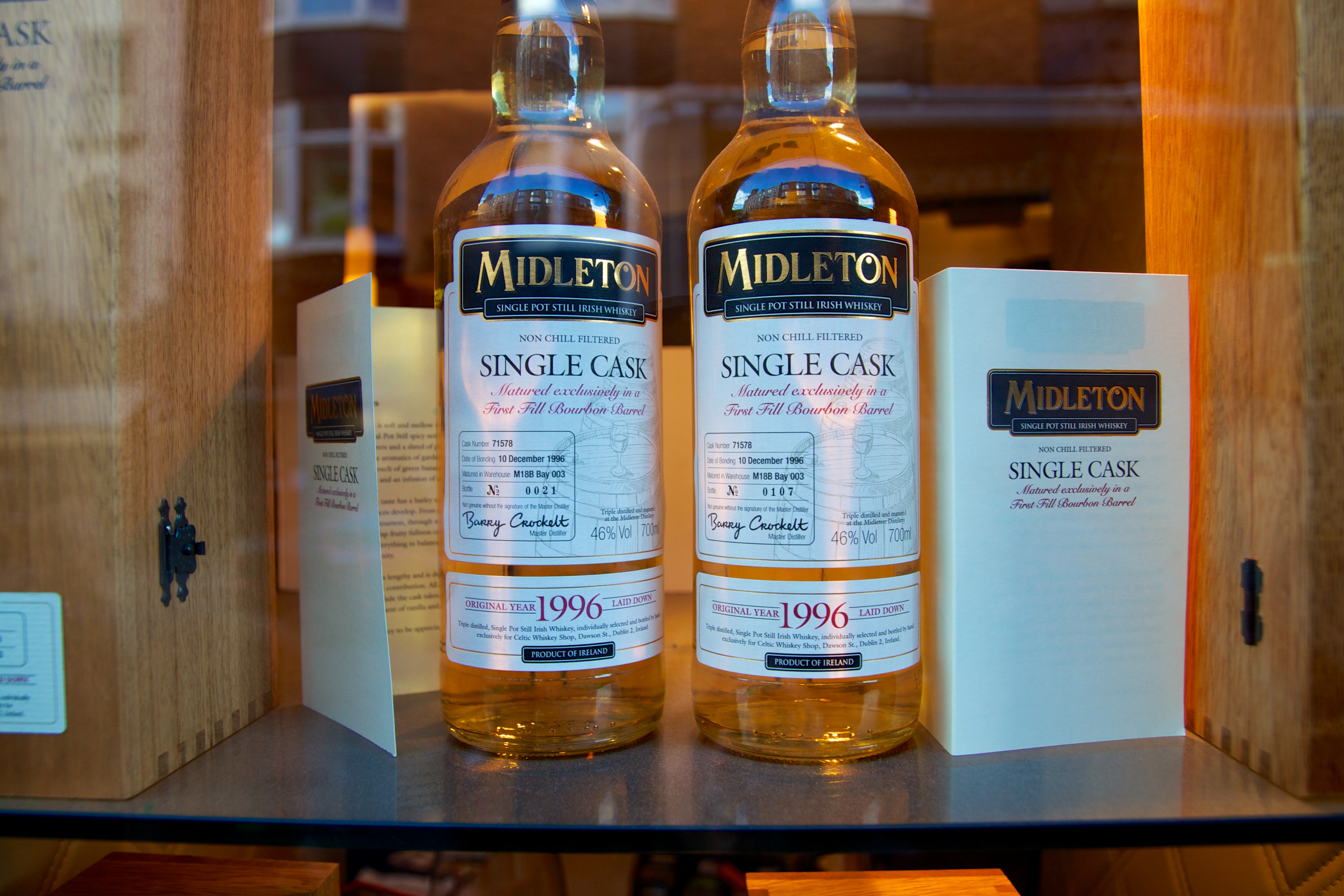
Bottles of Midleton Single Cask

In September 2014, to commemorate the 30th or Pearl anniversary of Midleton Very Rare Irish Whiskey, Midleton Distillery invited their Master Distiller Emeritus Barry Crockett out of retirement to join his successor and current Master Distiller Brian Nation in producing a special anniversary edition. The whiskey, Midleton Very Rare 30th Anniversary Pearl Edition, was limited to just 117 bottles, and released at a higher strength (53.1% ABV) than the original.

In addition to Midleton Very Rare (a blend), several single pot still whiskeys have been released under the Midleton banner throughout the years:

- Midleton 25-year-old Pure Pot Still, 43% ABV, one-off bottling distilled in 1973, and matured in Oloroso butts
- Midleton 26-year-old Pure Pot Still, 40% ABV, one-off bottling distilled in 1974, and released to celebrate the 175th anniversary of the Old Midleton Distillery, matured in Oloroso butts, and finished for one-year in a Port pipe
- Midleton 30-year old Pure Pot Still, 40% ABV, one-off bottling distilled in 1969 and released in 1999
- Midleton Single Cask, released in differing formats on several occasions
- Midleton Dair Ghaelach, 57.9% ABV, 15-22 year old pot still whiskey matured in bourbon barrels, and finished for a year in virgin Irish oak barrels (a first for Irish whiskey)

Recently, a Midleton single pot still variant was released as an ongoing bottling to celebrate the career of Barry Crockett, the former Master Distiller at Midleton. Crockett who retired after 47 years at the Midleton distilleries helped to formulate the whiskey himself:

- Midleton Barry Crockett Legacy Single Pot Still, 46% ABV, matured mainly in Bourbon barrels, with a portion matured in virgin American Oak barrels.

== Reviews ==
Midleton whiskey variants have received strong reviews from a number of sources over the years, for instance:

- In 2016, Jim Murray, whiskey writer and author of the Whisky Bible rated Midleton Dair Ghaelach number three in his 2016 World Whiskeys of the Year. At the time, that was the highest position Murray had ever ranked an Irish whiskey.
- In 2014, three Midleton variants scored above 90 points in Jim Murray's 2014 Whisky Bible (Midleton Single Pot Still Cask 1991 – 96.5 points; Midleton Single Pot Still Single Cask 1994 – 93 points; Midleton Barry Crockett Legacy – 94 points).

== See also ==
- Irish whiskey
- Irish whiskey brands
