= Jameson Distillery Bow St. =

Former Irish Whiskey distillery and a tourist attraction in Dublin, Ireland

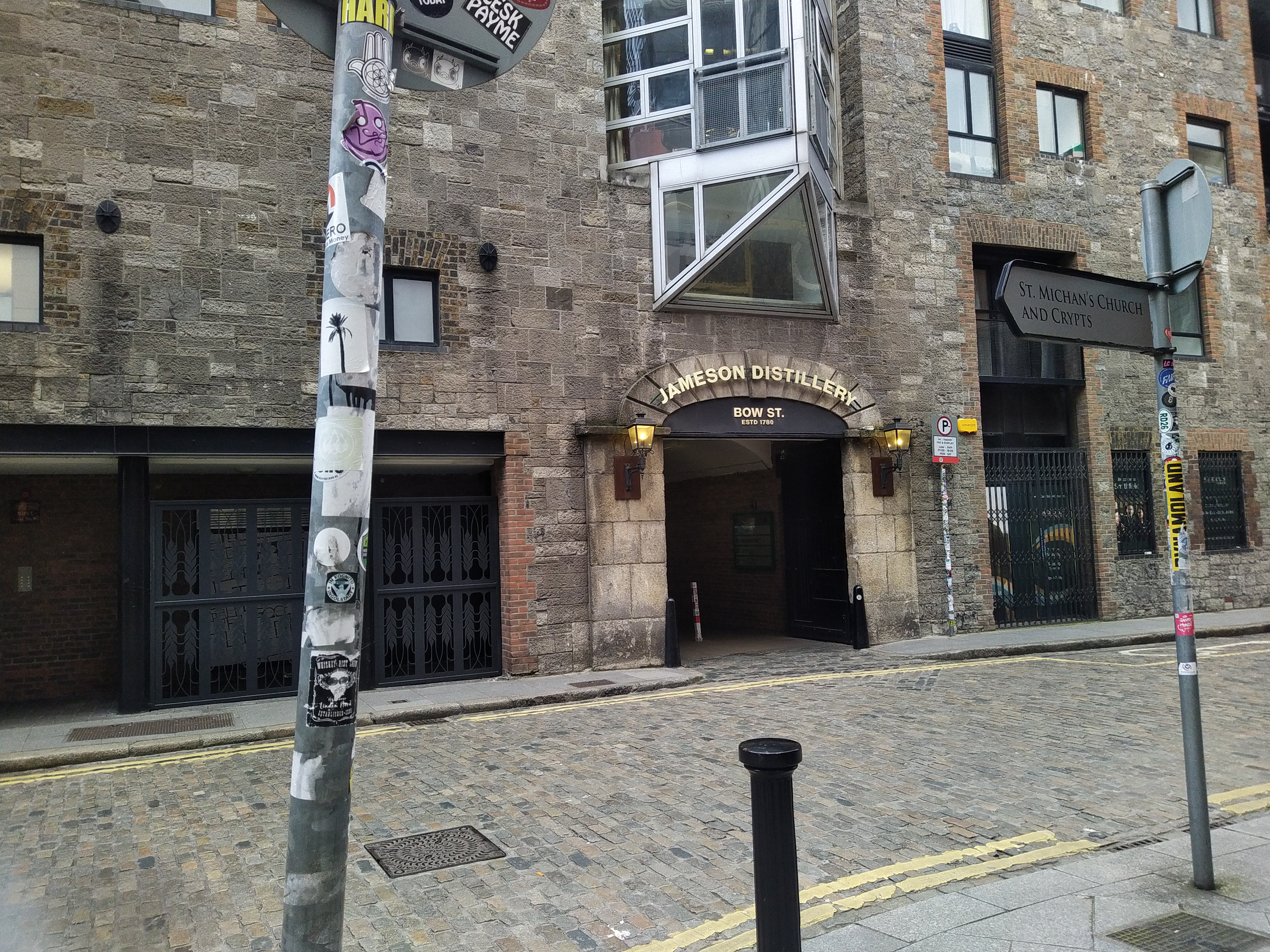
- Jameson Distillery Bow St.
- Location: Bow Street, Smithfield, Dublin, Ireland
- Coordinates: 53.3482°N 6.2768°W
- Founded: 1780
- Status: Closed since 1971. Visitors Centre since 1997
- No. of stills: four stills and two wash stills, each holding 24,000 gallons

Jameson Distillery Bow St. (informally the Jameson Distillery) is a former Irish whiskey distillery and a tourist attraction located just off Smithfield Square on Bow Street in Dublin, Ireland. Jameson Distillery Bow St. is the original site where Jameson Irish Whiskey was distilled until 1971. It is now a visitors centre that provides guided tours, tutored whiskey tastings, JJs bar and a gift shop.

== History ==
The original distillery on this site was called the Bow Street Distillery and was established in 1780. John Jameson took full ownership (he was previously the general manager) and expanded the distillery in 1805. By 1810, the operation was officially renamed to John Jameson & Son’s Bow Street Distillery. The distillery grew to upwards of 5 acres (2 ha) in size by 1886.

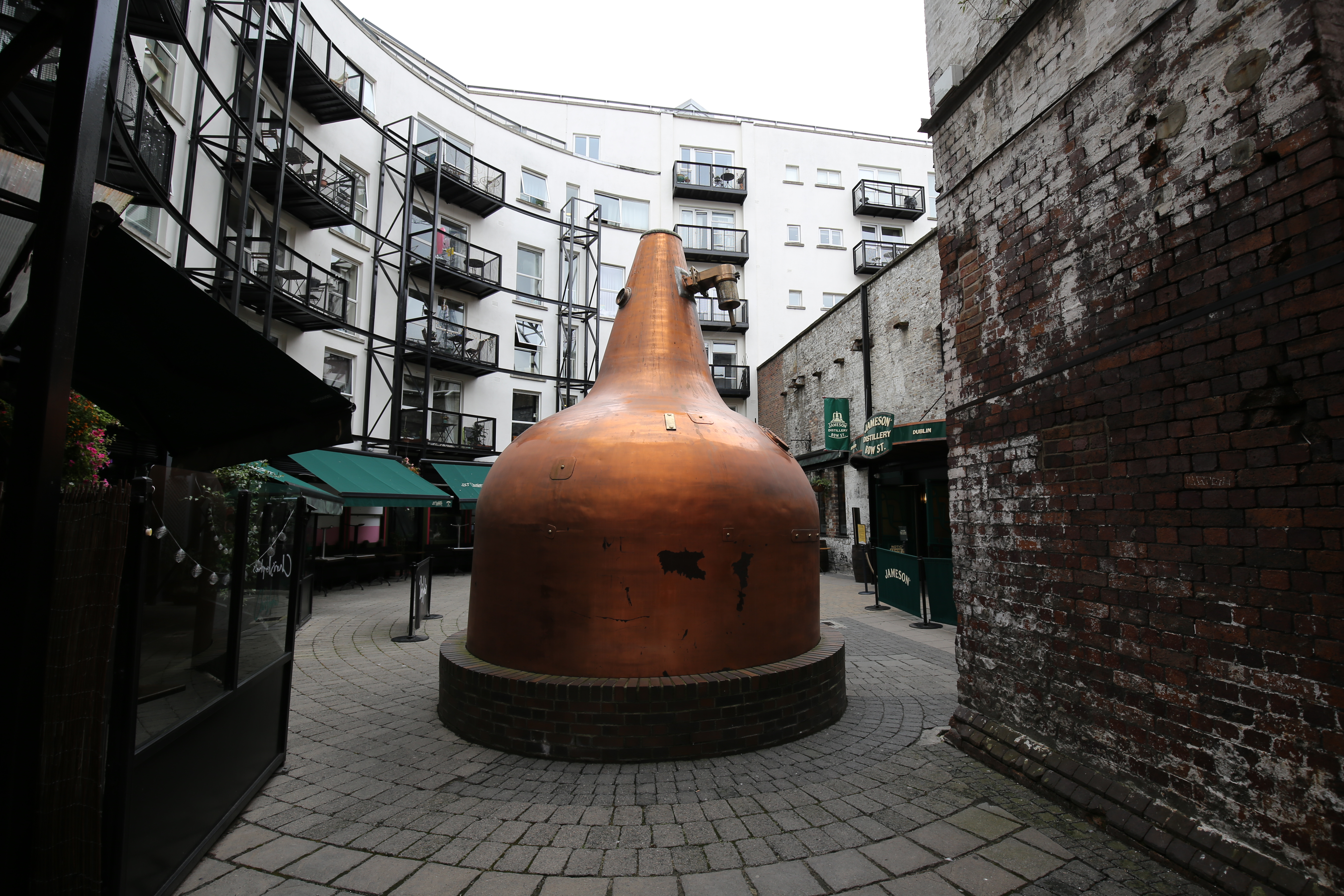
Copper still at the Distillery

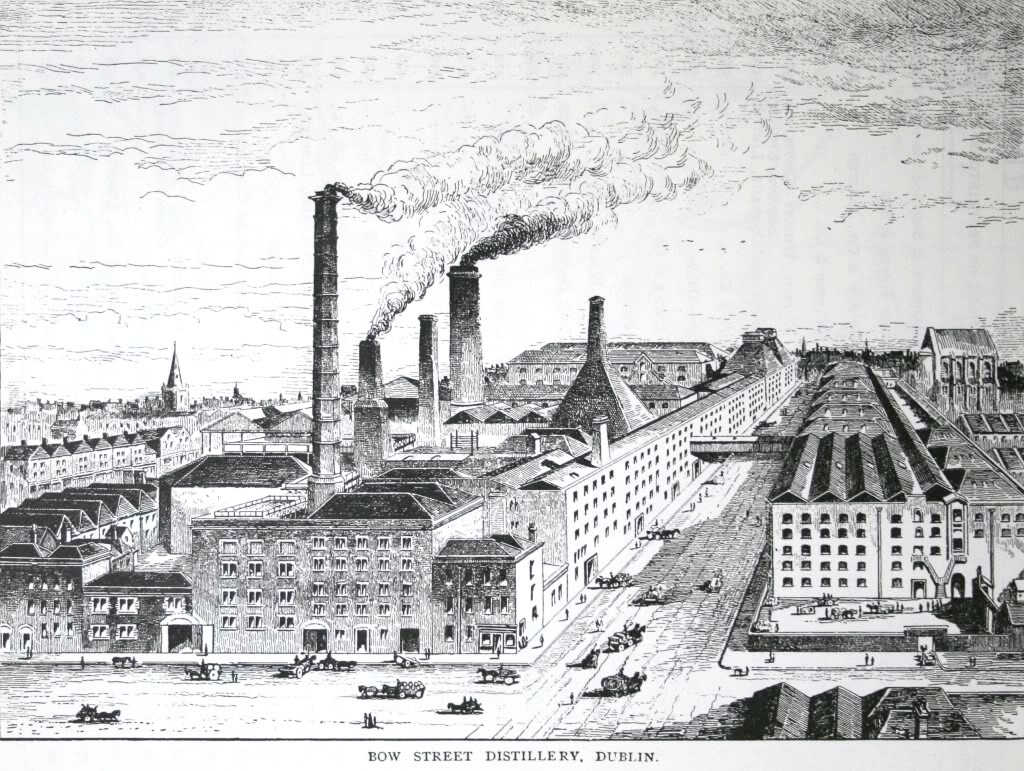
The Bow St. distillery in 1887

At this time, it was described by many as a "city within a city". The distillery also housed a smithy, cooperage, saw mills, engineers, carpenters, painters and coppersmiths’ shops. Water for the distillery came from two deep wells dug underneath the site. Cellars were also dug underneath nearby streets to store maturing whiskey, while four stills and two wash stills, each holding 24,000 gallons (109,000 litres), were heated by both fire and steam coils above.

Following a difficult period that included American Prohibition, Ireland’s trade war with Great Britain, and the introduction of Scotch blended whiskey, the Jameson distillery fell on hard times and decided to form the Irish Distillers Group with their previous rivals, the Cork Distilleries Company and John Power & Son in 1966. Eventually, it became one of the last distilleries in Ireland to close in 1971. The operation was then moved out of Dublin to the New Midleton Distillery.

== See also ==
- Old Midleton Distillery
