= John Brannick =

John Brannick (1830 – 2 July 1895) was an Irish whiskey maker, and founder and master distiller of the Dublin Whiskey Distillery Company.

== Early life and career ==
Born into a Dublin family of whiskey distillers in 1830, Brannick's father, Patrick Brannick was "for twenty-five years in the distillery of Sir John Power". Brannick "spent considerable time" working with his father in Power's distillery, before going to work for the distillery of George Roe and Son, with whom he remained for nearly twenty years, from 1852 to 1872. Brannick "successfully acted as Chief Distiller for Messrs. John Power & Son and Messrs. George Row & Co. for many years". After briefly managing a distillery in Limerick, Brannick "returned to Dublin to superintend the building of the Dublin Whiskey Distillery at Jones's-road".

== Dublin Whiskey Distillery ==
Through the Dublin Whiskey Distillery Company, Brannick was a founder and operator of the subsidiary Jones Road Distillery, established by a consortium of seven businessmen. Construction began in July 1872, and by July 1873 mashing had commenced. It was one of the six great Irish whiskey distilleries of Dublin city visited and documented by Alfred Barnard in 1886 for his seminal 1887 publication "The Whisky Distilleries of the United Kingdom". It was located on the north side of the city on the banks of the river Tolka, approximately a mile north of the city center. The Irish whiskey produced there was sold under the brand name D.W.D., with the first mash being produced in July 1873. Barnard reported that it was equipped with some of the best and most modern distilling equipment available at that time, and had a capacity of 800,000 gallons per annum. Early in his tenure at this company, Brannick married Mary Hayes, on 26 January 1873. Brannick presented samples of charcoal and pyroligneous acid (both used in the production of whiskey) at the 1883 Cork Industrial Exhibition.

Brannick "initiated the Dublin Whiskey Distillery Co.'s undertaking, the distillation of that Co. being under Mr. Brannick's sole control from the time it was started" until he left to manage the Banagher Distillery Co." During this time, Brannick became "one of the best known and most successful of the Irish distillers", known for being "one who in Dublin had learned the secrets of the trade". Under Brannick's management, whiskey from the Dublin Whiskey Distillery Co. "became a well known and celebrated commodity in the whiskey market". Brannick's tenure managing the Dublin Whiskey Distillery Co. was seventeen years. Brannick left the Dublin Whiskey Distillery in 1887, but remained a shareholder, and continued to maintain an interest through the Dublin Whiskey Distillery Co.'s 1891 amalgamation with other major distillers.

== Banagher Distillery ==
Beginning 1 October 1887, Brannick oversaw the reopening of the Banagher Distillery, which had previously been bankrupted and fallen into disuse under its prior owners. Brannick was the guest of honor at a banquet of 150 people held Saturday 5 November 1887, "on the occasion of his departure from Dublin, where he had for many years occupied the position of general manager and distiller at the Dublin Whiskey Distillery Company, to take up the position of director and distiller in the newly re-opened whiskey distillery at Banagher".

Brannick's reputation, after seventeen years as distiller and manager of the Dublin Whiskey Distillery Co., was widely reported, and advertised by his new employer:

The Banagher Distillery is under the charge of Mr. John Brannick, who has been so long and favorably known as the Distiller of the Dublin Whiskey Distillery Company, where he acted in that capacity from its inception to the time of his joining the Banagher Distillery Company in October 1887. The fine quality of the whiskey produced at Banagher by Mr. John Brannick has been greatly appreciated by the trade.

In 1889, it was reported that the Banagher Distillery was "now under full work", under Brannick's charge as Distiller and Director. Throughout his life, Brannick supported several charitable causes, and continued doing so while managing the Banagher Distillery. For example, in October 1989, it was reported that Brannick had donated a Clydesdale horse valued at £50 as one of the more valuable prizes put up to raise funds for the completion of St. Mel's Cathedral in Longford.

== Monasterevan Distillery, and Brannick's death ==
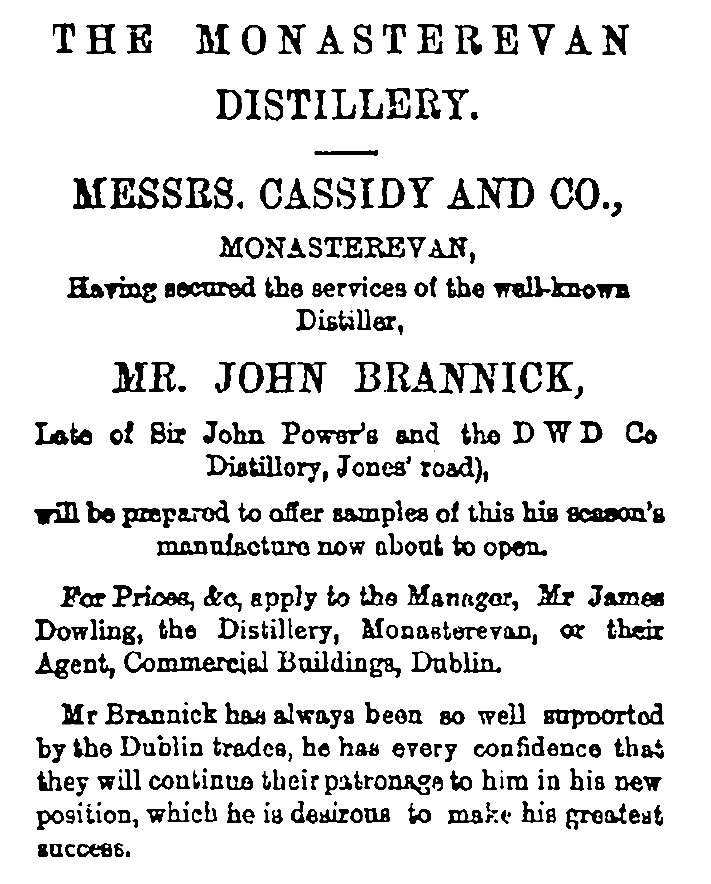
1890 Advertisement by the Monasterevan Distillery touting the hiring of John Brannick as distiller.

Towards the end of 1892, the Monasterevan Distillery advertised that they had "secured the service of the well-known Distiller, Mr. John Brannick, Late of Sir John Powers and the DWD Co Distillery, Jones' Road", asserting that Brannick "has always been so well supported by the Dublin trades, he has every confidence that they will continue their patronage to him in his new position, which he is desirous to make his greatest success". According to Brannick's 1893 testimony as a witness in litigation against the Dublin Whiskey Distillery following the accidental death of an employee, he remained a shareholder in that company, and after serving as managing director of the Banagher establishment, was then a distiller at Cassidy's, Monasterevan, "where he had 100 men employed". In January 1895, it was reported at the Ballickmoyler Petty Sessions for the 11th of that month that Brannick was "appointed sole general manager as well as distiller" of Monasterevan Distillery, taking the place of the recently deceased James Dowling.

Brannick's last position was to be short-lived; he died in Monasterevan on 2 July 1895, from influenza. Brannick was survived by his wife, and his estate was administered by Barrington & Son. All told, Brannick was a distiller for over forty years. Within his industry he was considered "sui generis" (without equal), at a time when Dublin, for much of the 19th century, was described as the whiskey powerhouse of the world.
