= List of baronetcies in the Baronetage of the United Kingdom: O =

Peerages and baronetcies of Britain and Ireland
Extant	All
Dukes	Dukedoms
Marquesses	Marquessates
Earls	Earldoms
Viscounts	Viscountcies
Barons	Baronies
Baronets	Baronetcies
En, Ire, NS, GB, UK (extinct)

This is a list of baronetcies in the Baronetage of the United Kingdom. They have been created since 1801 when they replaced the baronetages in the Baronetage of Great Britain, and Baronetage of Ireland. This list is not currently complete.

Title	Date of creation	Surname	Current status	Notes
O'Brien of Ardtona	1916	O'Brien	extinct 1916	first Baronet created Baron Shandon in 1918
O'Brien of Kilfenora	1891	O'Brien	extinct 1914	first Baronet created Baron O'Brien in 1900
O'Brien of Merrion Square and Borris-in-Ossory	1849	O'Brien	dormant	Lord Mayor of Dublin; sixth Baronet died 1982
O'Loghlen of Drumcanora	1838	O'Loghlen	extant	
O'Malley of Rosehill	1804	O'Malley	extinct 1892	
O'Connell of Lakeview	1869	O'Connell	extant	
O'Neill of Cleggan	1929	O'Neill	extant	first Baronet created Baron Rathcavan in 1953
Oakes of Hereford	1815	Oakes	extinct 1927	first Baronet had already been created a Baronet in 1813, which creation became extinct in 1822
Oakes of Nassau	1939	Oakes	extant	
Oakes of the Army	1813	Oakes	extinct 1822	first Baronet obtained a new patent in 1815, which creation became extinct in 1927
Oakshott	1959	Oakshott	extant	first Baronet created a life peer as Baron Oakshott in 1964, which title became extinct in 1975
Ochterlony of Ochterlony	1823	Ochterlony	extinct 1964	had already been created Baronet of Pitforthy in 1816, which title became extinct in 1825
Ochterlony of Pitforthy	1816	Ochterlony	extinct 1825	also created Baronet of Ochterlony in 1823, which title became extinct in 1964
Ogle of Worthy	1816	Ogle	extinct 1940	
Ohlson of Scarborough	1920	Ohlson	extant	
Oppenheimer of Stoke Poges	1921	Oppenheimer	extinct 2020	
Ormsby of Cloghans	1812	Ormsby	extinct 1833	
Orr-Ewing of Ballikinran	1886	Orr-Ewing	extant	
Orr-Ewing of Hendon	1963	Orr-Ewing	extant	first Baronet created a life peer as Baron Orr-Ewing in 1971, which title became extinct in 1999
Orr-Lewis of Whitewebbs Park	1920	Orr-Lewis	extinct 1980	
Osler of Norham Gardens	1911	Osler	extinct 1919	
Otway of Brighthelmstone	1831	Otway	extinct 1912	
Ouseley of Claremont	1808	Ouseley	extinct 1889	
Outram of The Bengal	1858	Outram	extant	
Owen of Orielton	1813	Owen	extinct 2002	
