= Jones Road Distillery =

Irish distillery

D.W.D. Jones Road Distillery
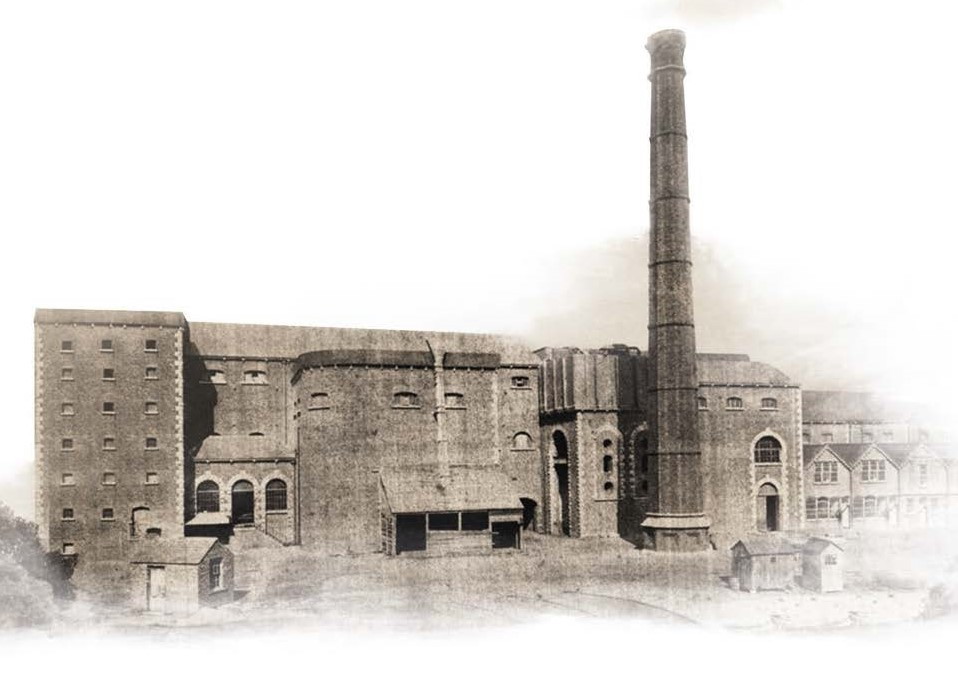
- The D.W.D. Distillery under construction c. 1872/1873
- Location: Dublin, Ireland
- Coordinates: 53°21′47.538″N 6°14′54.0344″W
- Owner: Dublin Whiskey Distillery Company
- Founded: 1872
- Founder: John Brannick
- Status: Voluntarily shutdown and liquidated by management in 1941; distillery buildings redeveloped in 2003 by Tyler Owens Architects, for residential and commercial use
- Water source: Royal Canal, onsite
- No. of stills: 4 pot stills
- Capacity: 800,000 gallons annual production & 20,000 barrels warehousing

D.W.D.
- Type: Single Pot Still Whiskey

D.W.D. Jones Road Distillery 2017
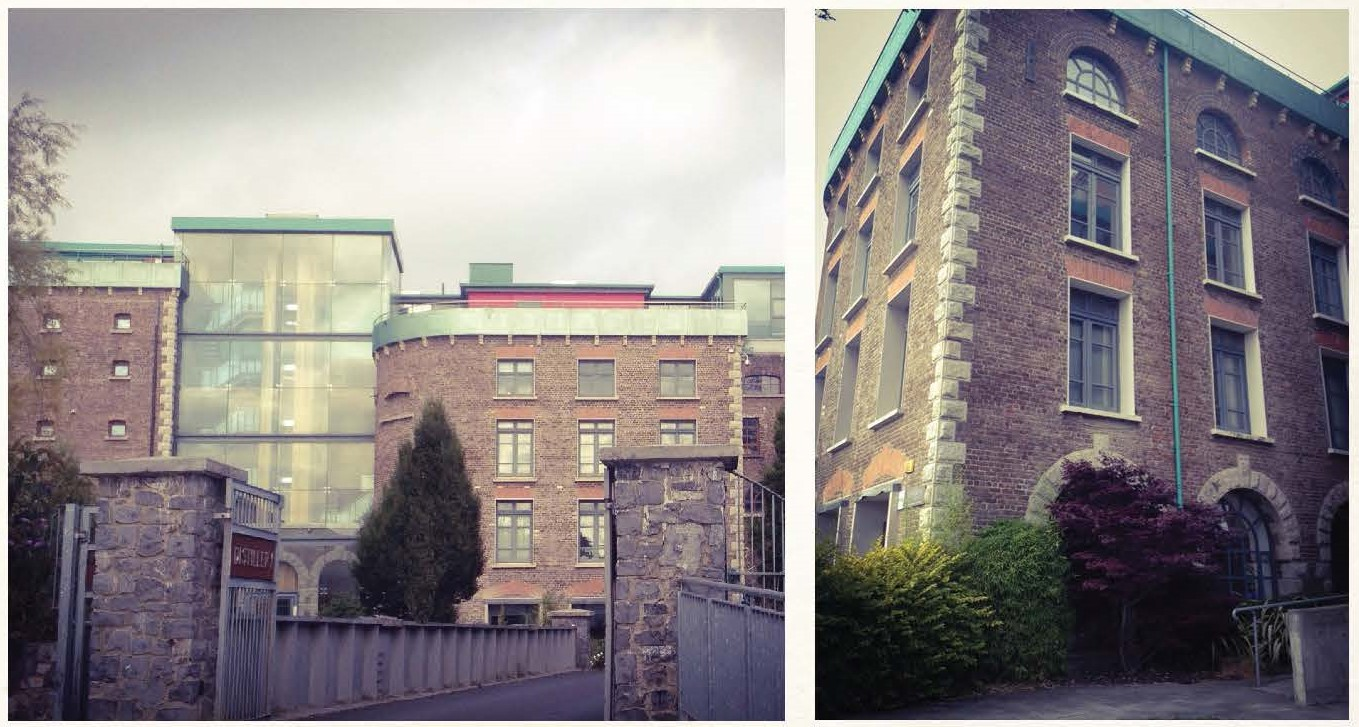
- Status: Distillery buildings fully redeveloped in 2003 for residential and office use

The Dublin Whiskey Distillery Company Jones Road Distillery, also known as the D.W.D. Distillery, Jones Road, or just Jones Road Distillery, was one of the six great Irish whiskey distilleries of Dublin city visited and documented by Alfred Barnard in his seminal 1887 publication "The Whisky Distilleries of the United Kingdom". It was located on the north side of the city on the banks of the River Tolka, approximately a mile north of the city centre. The distillery was built by the Dublin Whiskey Distillery Company Ltd and the Irish whiskey produced sold around the world under the brand name D.W.D.

Construction began on 22 July 1872, under the supervision of founder John Brannick, and exactly one year later on the 22 July 1873, D.W.D.'s first mash was produced. Distillation continued up until 1941. During the intervening 70 years, D.W.D. became a renowned Irish whiskey brand and by 1941 D.W.D. was a significant and profitable enterprise with substantial maturing stocks and distilling assets. D.W.D. was broken up and the assets sold between 1941 and 1946, creating lasting controversy over the conditions under which the Irish Government allowed the closure and liquidation to happen.

D.W.D. was the last of Dublin's great distilleries to be built, and along with the other five made Dublin at the end of the 19th century a global whiskey distilling powerhouse. As of 2017, of the six great Dublin distilleries profiled by Alfred Barnard, the D.W.D. distillery buildings, and those of Jameson located in Smithfield Dublin, are the only ones which remain standing.

== History ==
=== Foundation and early operations ===
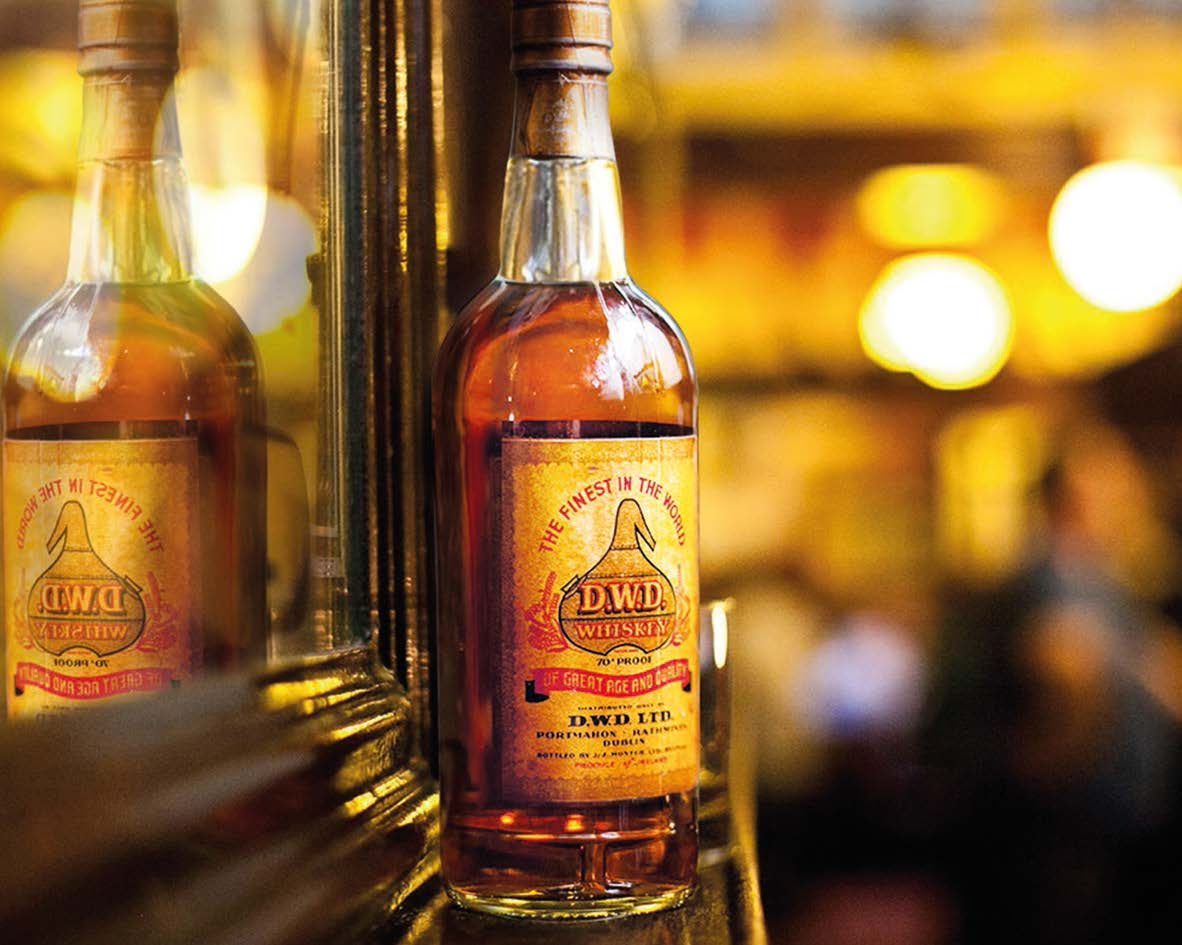
Original unopened D.W.D. bottle, Palace Bar, Fleet Street, Dublin.

Founder John Brannick was "for twenty-five years in the distillery of Sir John Power", and for twenty years after that was Chief Distiller for Messrs. George Roe & Son, before leaving that position "to superintend the building of the Dublin Whiskey Distillery at Jones's-road". In 1870, Brannick "initiated the Dublin Whiskey Distillery Co.'s undertaking, securing the backing of a consortium of seven businessmen to establish the company and build the most modern and advanced distillery in Dublin City.

Unlike the other Dublin distilleries, which began as family-run enterprises, the Jones Road Distillery was established by a consortium of seven businessmen. Construction beginning in July 1872; by July 1873 mashing had commenced. It was one of the six great Irish whiskey distilleries of Dublin city visited and documented by Alfred Barnard in 1886 for his seminal 1887 publication "The Whisky Distilleries of the United Kingdom". It was located on the north side of the city on the banks of the river Tolka, approximately a mile north of the city center. The Irish whiskey produced there was sold under the brand name D.W.D., with the first mash being produced in July 1873. Barnard reported that it was equipped with some of the best and most modern distilling equipment available at that time, and had a capacity of 800,000 gallons per annum.

A seven acre site was chosen for the distillery, situated on a delta formed by the river Tolka on the south, Richmond road to the north and extended west as far as the Ballbough bridges. Access to the distillery from Jones Road was by bridge spanning the Tolka. Alfred Barnard described D.W.D. as "The most modern of the distilleries in Dublin, it rears its head proud like a monument built to commemorate the virtues of some dead hero". Despite the river Tolka running through the complex and the construction of a 100-foot-deep well, water for distilling was sourced from the Royal canal through a mile-long pipe. Water from the Royal Canal was favoured as the same water source was utilised by the Jameson Distillery.

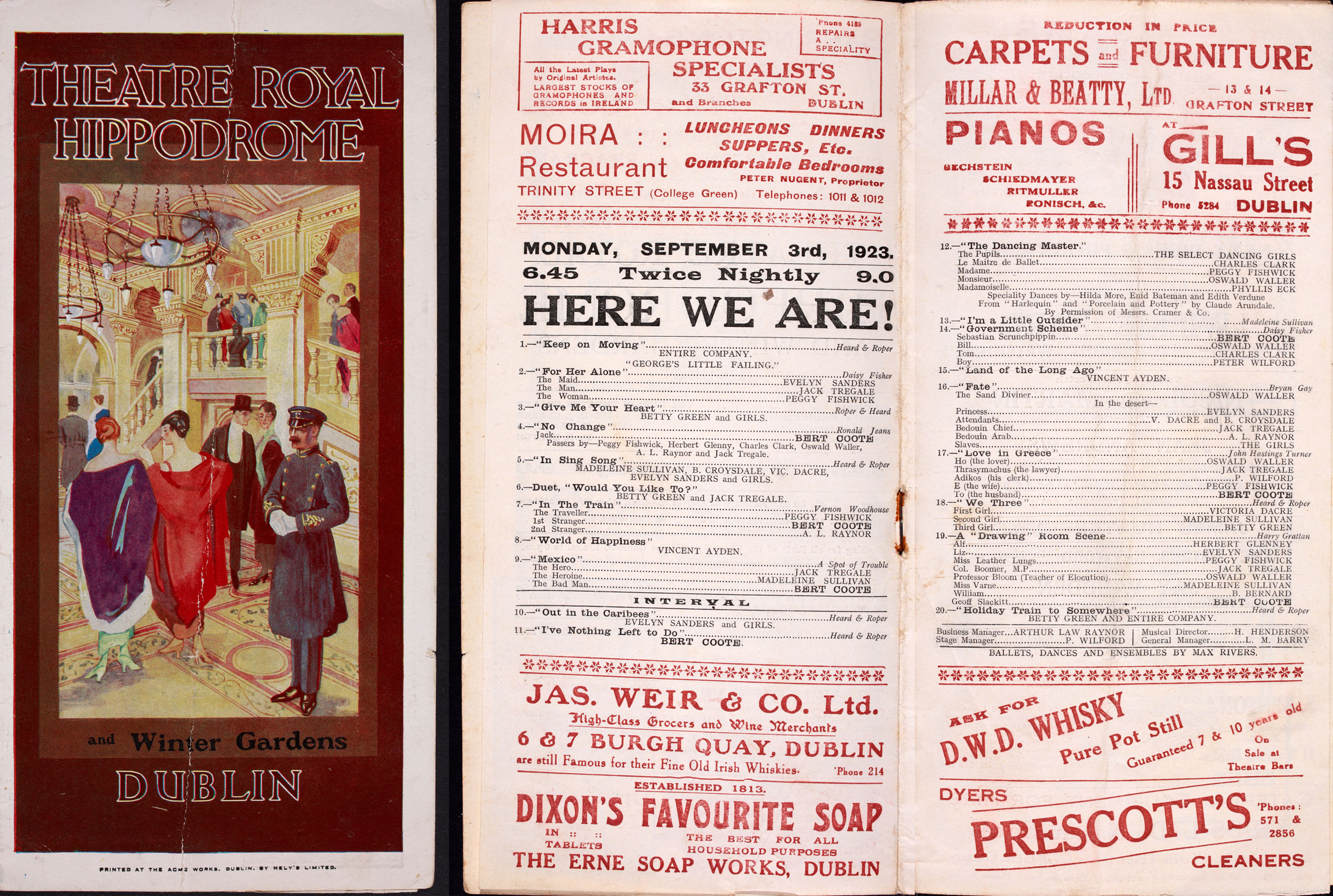
A programme from a 1923 Variety show containing an advert for D.W.D. Pure Pot Still Whisky.

The distillery produced spirit utilising the pot still batch distilling process. The Still House, which stood 60 feet high contained four pot stills on the ground floor around which plant machinery was configured across three gantry floors. The whiskey itself was single pot still whiskey made from a mash of malted barley and corn distilled in D.W.D.'s pot stills. Although D.W.D. used the same water source as the Jameson distillery, D.W.D. whiskey differed to Jameson by using corn in its mash whereas the latter used green barley. In this regard D.W.D. adopted the same practice as the other great Dublin distillery, George Roe & Co, no doubt influenced by John Brannick's 20-year tenure with George Roe & Co. Spencer Blackett's Industries of Dublin claimed "the introduction of the D.W.D. brand had created a revolution and brought the production [of whiskey] to a degree of perfection never attained"; while Barnard stated, "[t]he product made by D.W.D. is of the highest class of Dublin make".

Distillation was "under Mr. Brannick's sole control from the time it was started" until he left to manage the Banagher Distillery Co." in 1887. The Irish whiskey industry experienced a period of decline in the 1870s, so it is unlikely that the distillery operated at its capacity for its first decade of production. When the British historian, Alfred Barnard visited the distillery not long after it opened in 1886, he reported that it was equipped with some of the best and most modern distilling equipment available at that time, and had a maximum capacity of 800,000 gallons per annum, with an actual output of 560,000 gallons. During the seventeen years of Brannick's management, Brannick became "one of the best known and most successful of the Irish distillers", and D.W.D. "became a well known and celebrated commodity in the whiskey market". After leaving that position, Brannick remained a shareholder in D.W.D.

=== Amalgamation into Dublin Distillers Company ===
In 1891, D.W.D. merged with two other major distillers, combining the output of the Jones Road Distillery with the Marrowbone Lane Distillery of William Jameson & Co and the Thomas Street Distillery of George Roe & Co, to form Dublin Distillers Company Limited.

The amalgamated company had a combined distillation capacity of 3.5 million gallons per year. However, the three distilleries continued to operate separately and compete directly ensuring the anticipated economies of scale from the merger were never realised. The industry experienced difficulties in the 1920s, brought about the loss of both the American and British Commonwealth export markets during prohibition and the Anglo-Irish trade war. Both William Jameson & Co and George Roe & Co would eventually close in 1923 with their respective production transferred to the D.W.D. distillery.

=== Closure and later conversion of buildings ===
As the most modern of the three plants, the Jones Road plant was likely retained as a working entity. Despite the long-term commercial opportunities which these holdings presented, D.W.D. management instead made the decision to voluntarily liquidate D.W.D., and sold off all the distillery's assets for significant financial gain during the war years. The last asset to be liquidated was the Jones Road distillery site itself which sold at auction on 10 October 1946.

The voluntary closure and break up of D.W.D. was directly enabled by the Irish Government, which issued D.W.D. with the only export licence granted to any Irish distillery during the Second World War. Export licences had been imposed by the Irish State on the Irish whiskey industry under the Emergency Powers (Export of Whiskey) Order, 1941. Apart from D.W.D., no export licences were ever issued and as a consequence the Irish government shut down large-scale Irish whiskey distillery production for the duration of the war. Why an exception was made for D.W.D. contrary to government policy of the day remains unexplained. Without the export licence, however, D.W.D. could not have been dismantled. D.W.D.'s size and scale was comparable to peers including Jameson and Powers, which would have ensured its continuation. In the following years, questions were asked in the Dáil—the Irish Parliament—and explanations sought. The responses of government ministers were evasive. On 8 July 1953, Thomas F. O'Higgins, then member of parliament and future Chief Justice of Ireland, described the events leading to the closure of D.W.D. as "one of the greatest scandals that ever happened in this country".

The distillery's tall chimney was eventually removed, and other parts came to be used for various businesses, "such as engineering workshops and even a fitness centre during the 1990s", with a 2003 conversion turning some of the buildings into upmarket apartments, now known as Distillery Lofts. A 2012 Assessment of Special Interest Under the Planning & Development Act 2000 found the structure to be of architectural and historical significance, noting that "[t]he quality of the materials used in their construction and decorative detailing demonstrate that these buildings were cutting edge design for the specific requirements of distillery buildings", and that they remained "a significant reminder of the industrial landscape that once made up a significant element of the nineteenth century landscape adjacent to the Tolka River". As of 2017, two bottles from the Jones Road Distillery are known to remain in existence.

== Engineering ==
Barnard described the facility as "the most modern of the distilleries in Dublin", with mechanisms including "a 50hp Leffel Turbine for electricity, driven either by a big wheel in the adjoining River Tolka or by one of the plant's steam engines". Movement of water was facilitated by a double acting plunger pump supplied by Pearn & Co of Manchester, UK which was acknowledged as the finest specimen of hydraulic machinery in any Distillery in Dublin, being capable of raising 1000 gallons of water per minute. The primary power source for the distillery was via steam engine occupying an engine-house located in front of the Still Hall. The engine was manufactured and supplied by the iron founders and engineers, Messrs. Victor Coates & Co., of the Lagan Foundry and Price Dock Works, Belfast, which could generate 100 horse power. A secondary source of power was also incorporated into the distillery design in the form of a Leffel Turbine Wheel, manufactured by the James Leffel Co., New Haven, Connecticut, USA, which was positioned in the middle of the River Tolka which at full speed could produce up to 50 horsepower.

Because other whiskey distilleries of the time had often been damaged or destroyed by fires, the facility "boasted two novel safety measures: curtains around the Mash Tun to stop the grist blowing over the edges and massive water tanks on top of the flat roofs, used to store process water, which could be used in case of fire".

== Gallery ==
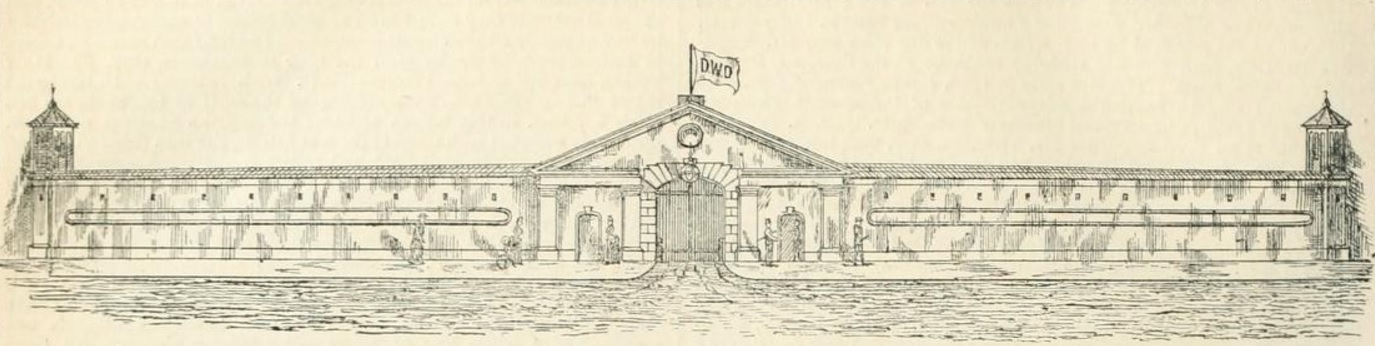
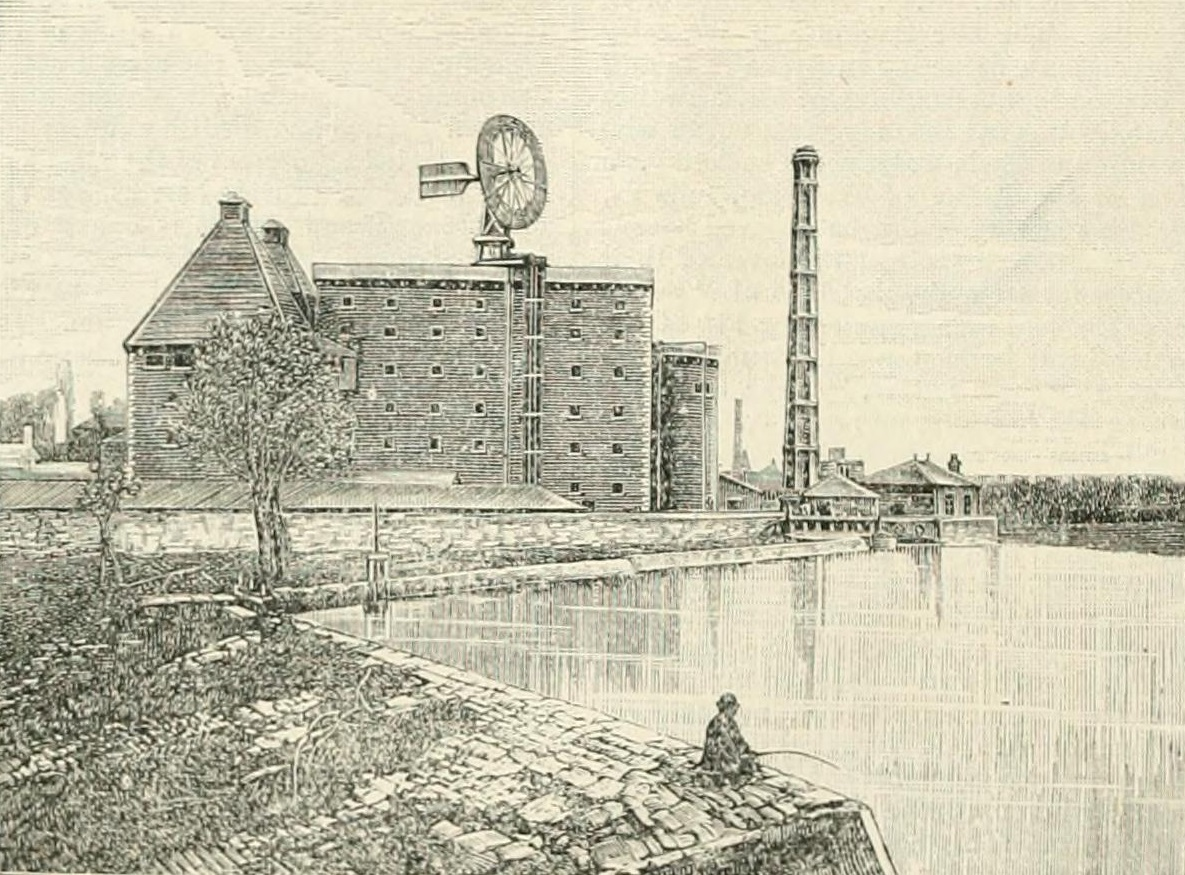
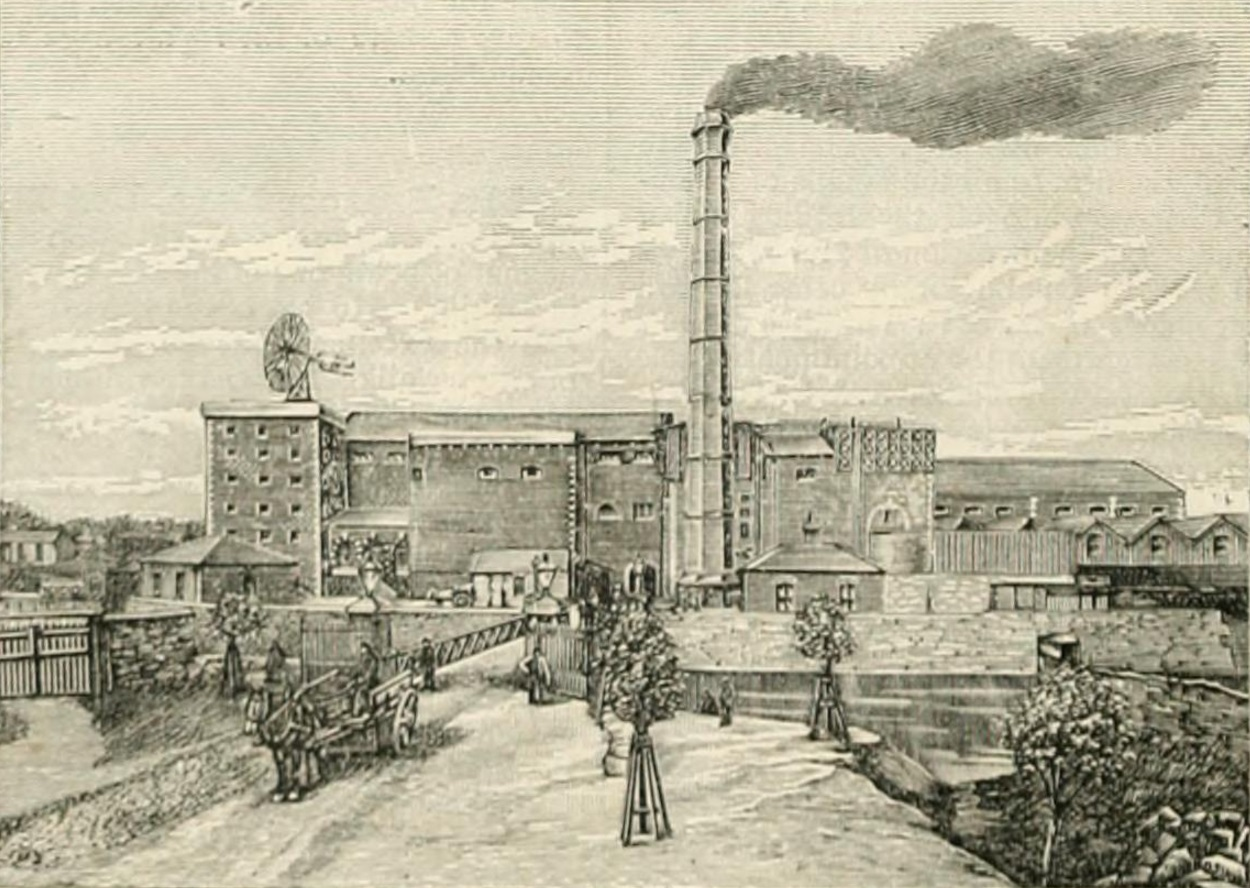
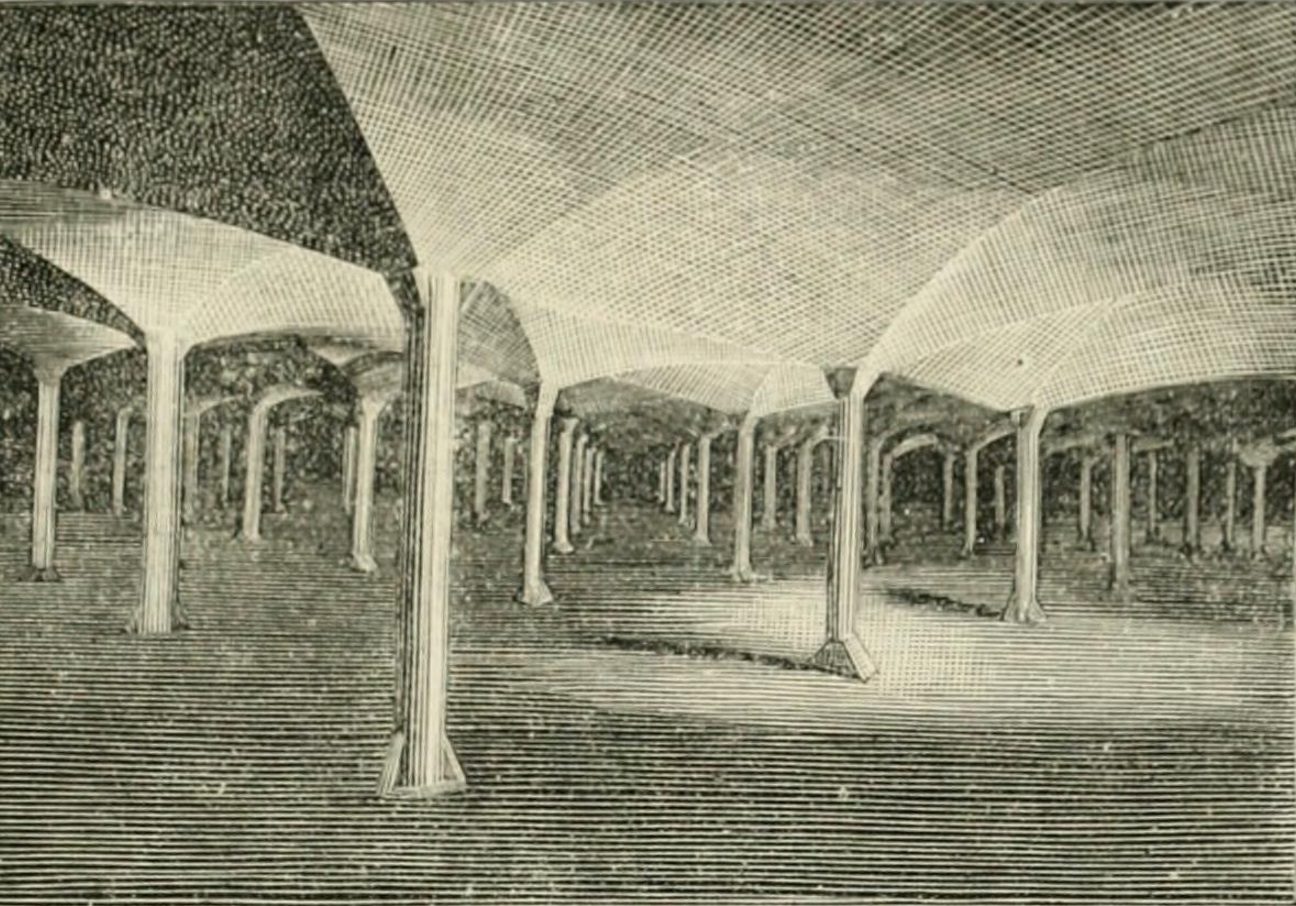
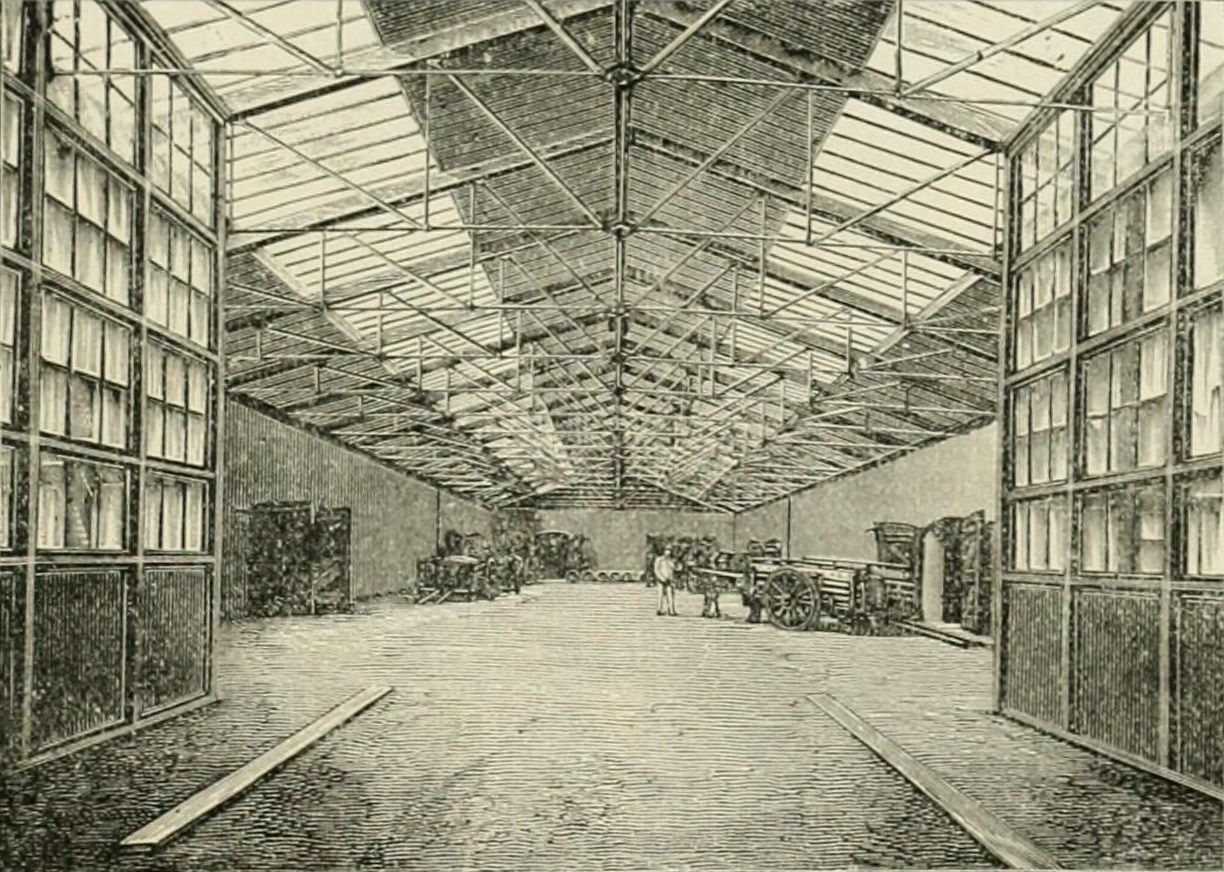
Drawings of the Dublin Whiskey Distillery from Spencer Blackett, The Industries of Dublin: Historical, Statistical, Biographical (1887).
Top: Main gate. Bottom row, from left to right: Northwest view, front view, warehouse interior, and warehouse main hall.

== See also ==
- Irish whiskey
- Irish whiskey brands

=== Bibliography ===
- Townsend, Brian (1999). The Lost Distilleries of Ireland. Glasgow: Angels' Share (Neil Wilson Publishing). ISBN 1897784872.
