= O'Brien baronets =

Baronetcy in the Baronetage of the United Kingdom

There have been four baronetcies created for persons with the surname O'Brien, one in the Baronetage of Ireland and three in the Baronetage of the United Kingdom.

The O'Brien Baronetcy, of Leaghmenagh in the County of Clare, was created in the Baronetage of Ireland on 9 November 1686; for more information see Baron Inchiquin.

The O'Brien Baronetcy, of Merrion Square in Dublin and Boris-in-Ossory in Queen's County, was created in the Baronetage of the United Kingdom on 25 September 1849 for Timothy O'Brien. He was a merchant, Lord Mayor of Dublin and Liberal Member of Parliament for Cashel. The second Baronet represented King's County in the House of Commons as a Liberal for over thirty years. The third Baronet was Lord Lieutenant of County Cork. The baronetcy has been considered dormant since the death of the 6th baronet in 1982 as the presumed 7th baronet does not appear on the Official Roll of the Baronetage.

The O'Brien Baronetcy was created in the Baronetage of the United Kingdom on 28 September 1891; for more information see Baron O'Brien.

The O'Brien Baronetcy was created in the Baronetage of the United Kingdom on 15 January 1916; for more information see Baron Shandon.

== O'Brien baronets of Leaghmenagh (1686) ==
- see Baron Inchiquin

== O'Brien baronets, of Merrion Square and Boris-in-Ossory (1849) ==
- Sir Timothy O'Brien, 1st Baronet (1787–1862)
- Sir Patrick O'Brien, 2nd Baronet (1823–1895)
- Sir Timothy Carew O'Brien, 3rd Baronet (1861–1948)
- Sir Robert Rollo Gillespie O'Brien, 4th Baronet (1901–1952)
- Sir John Edmond Noel O'Brien, 5th Baronet (1899–1969)
- Sir David Edmond O'Brien, 6th Baronet (1902–1982)
- Timothy John O'Brien, presumed 7th Baronet (born 1958). The title is as of 2026 marked dormant on the Official Roll.

The heir presumptive is James Patrick O'Brien (born 1964).

== O'Brien baronets (1891) ==
- see Baron O'Brien

== O'Brien baronets (1916) ==
- see Baron Shandon

== See also ==
- O'Brien dynasty
