= Peter Roe =

Peter Roe may refer to:

- Peter Roe (soccer) (born 1955), Canadian soccer player
- Peter Roe (rugby league), English rugby league player and coach
- Peter Roe, owner of Dublin's now defunct Thomas Street Distillery
