= Marrowbone Lane Distillery =

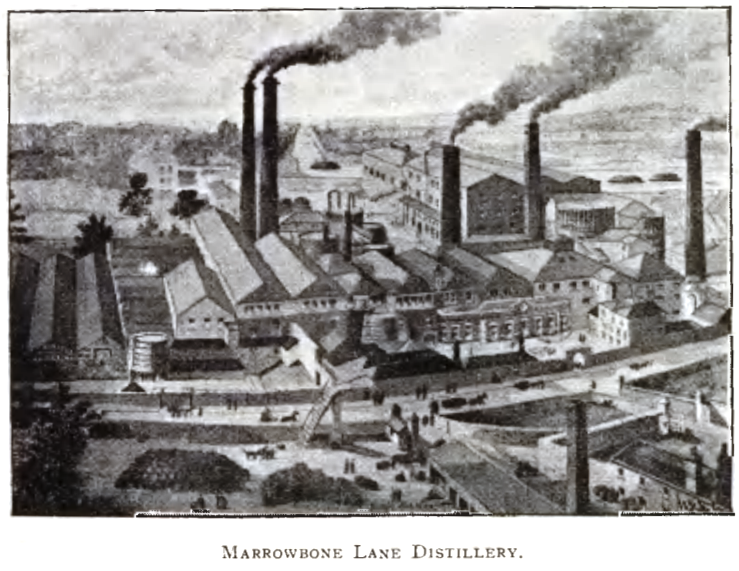
- Location: Dublin
- Coordinates: 53°20′25.2″N 6°17′08.3″W
- Owner: William Jameson & Co.
- Founded: 1750s
- Founder: William Jameson, John Stein
- Status: Defunct
- No. of stills: 4 pot stills (20,000, 12,000, 11,000 & 9,000 gallons)
- Capacity: >900,000 gallons
- Mothballed: 1923

Old Dublin Irish Whiskey
- Type: Single Pot Still Whiskey

The Marrowbone Lane Distillery was an Irish whiskey distillery located on Marrowbone Lane, in Dublin, Ireland. One of the "big four" historical Dublin whiskey firms, it was run by William Jameson, a member of the Jameson whiskey dynasty. However, the whiskey now known as Jameson Irish Whiskey was not produced at this distillery, but at the separate enterprise run by John Jameson at the nearby Bow Street Distillery. The distillery closed in 1923 following financial difficulties.

== History ==
An advert for William Jameson & Co. Whisky published in 1883.

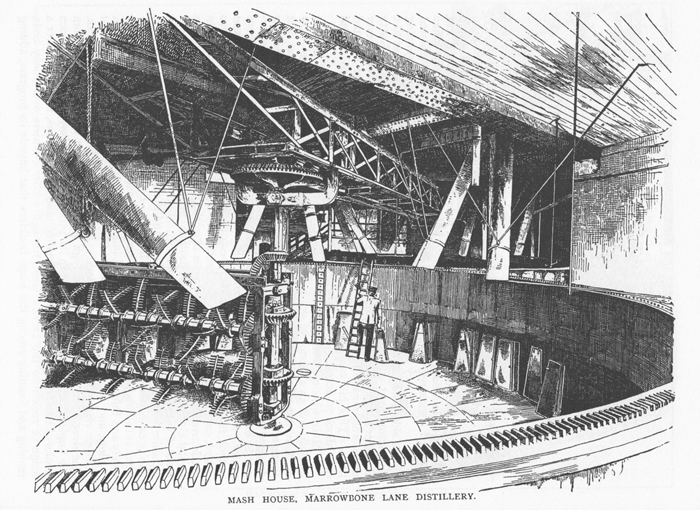
The Mash House at Marrowbone Lane Distillery, circa. 1887. The distillery's mash tuns were said to be the largest in the United Kingdom at the time.

The precise origins of the distillery are uncertain, however, it was likely established in the 1750s (possibly 1752) and later acquired by the Stein family, relatives of the Jameson family circa 1780. An excise return in 1802 lists Stein and Jameson, however, by 1822 the company had become William Jameson & Co.

Initially a small undertaking, with an output of just 30,000 gallons per annum, the distillery expanded over time, and by the time Alfred Barnard, a British historian visited the distillery in the 1880s, it had grown to cover some 14 acres. In his book, The Whisky Distilleries of the United Kingdom, Barnard described Marrowbone Lane as having some of the biggest distilling equipment in the world, including two mash tuns with capacities in excess of 100,000 gallons, which were the "said to be the largest in the United Kingdom". At its peak, the distillery was the second largest in Dublin (then one of the world's largest whiskey distilling centres), with an output of 900,000 gallons per annum, and a staff of 200, including 30 coopers. The whiskey produced at the distillery, known as "Dublin Whiskey" was chiefly exported to Australia, Canada, India and the United States.

Later renamed the Dublin Distilling Company, the company entered financial difficulties in the late 1800s, and in 1891, merged with George Roe's Thomas Street Distillery and the Dublin Whiskey Distillery Company's Jones Road Distillery to form the Dublin Distilleries Company Ltd. Although, the amalgamated company had a potential production capacity of 3.5 million gallons per annum, it continued to endure severe financial difficulties, in particular, following the loss of both the American and British Commonwealth export markets during prohibition and the Anglo-Irish trade war in the 1920s. Both the Thomas Street and Marrowbone Lane distilleries closed in 1923, with the Jones Road Distillery following suit in 1926. Though distilling may have continued at Jones Road until 1946.

During the 1916 Easter uprising, both the Marrowbone Lane distillery and Roe's distillery at Thomas Street were used as strongpoints by a force of more than a hundred rebels.

== See also ==
- Irish whiskey
- Irish whiskey brands

=== Bibliography ===
- Townsend, Brian (1997–1999). The Lost Distilleries of Ireland. Glasgow: Angels' Share (Neil Wilson Publishing). ISBN 1897784872.
