= Joseph Stock (bishop) =

Irish Protestant churchman and writer

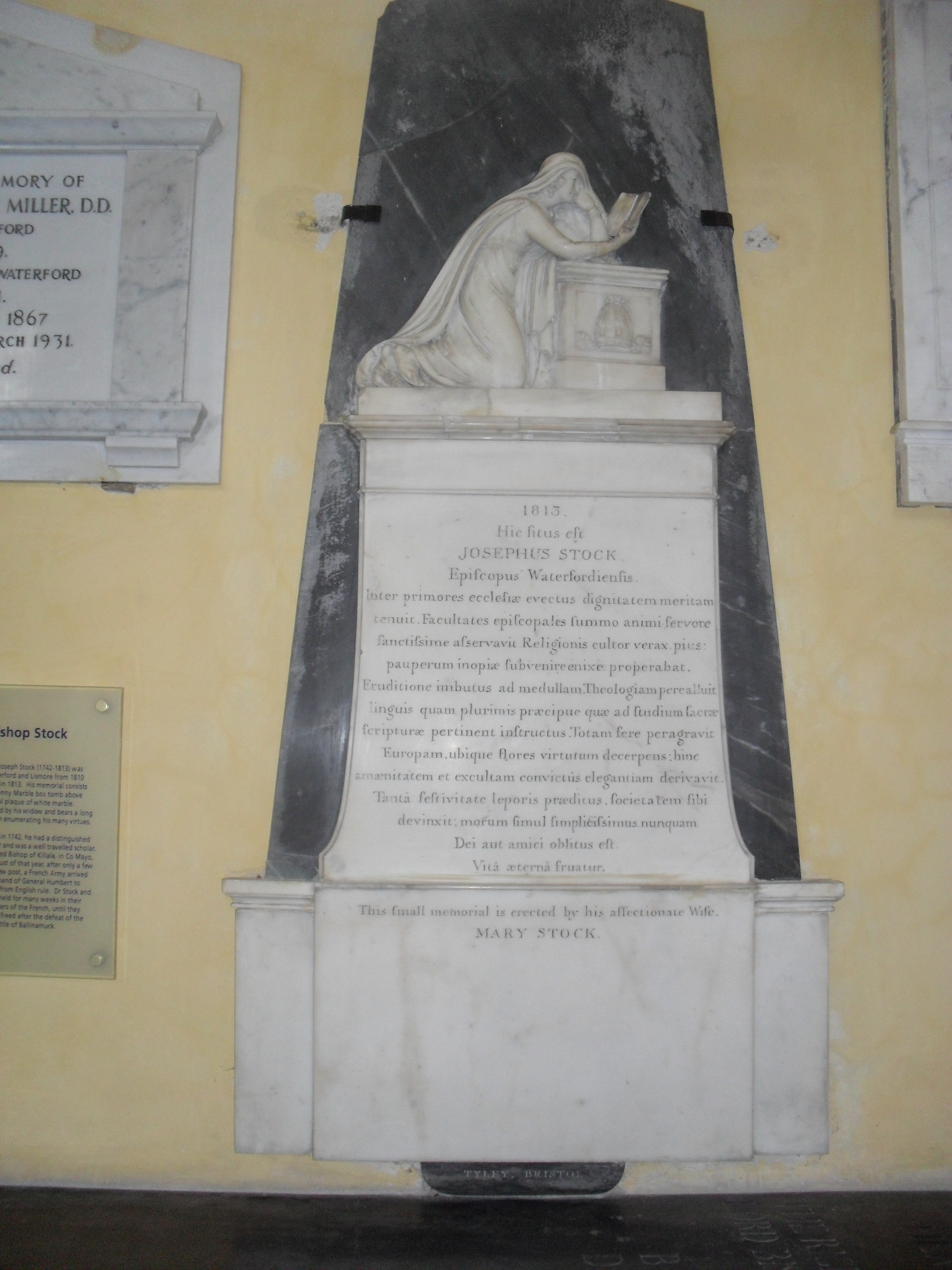
Memorial stone in Waterford Cathedral

Joseph Stock (1740–1813) was an Irish Protestant churchman and writer, bishop of Killala and Achonry and afterwards bishop of Waterford and Lismore.

== Life ==
He was the son of Luke Stock, a hosier, in Dublin, and Ann, his wife, and was born at 1 Dame Street, Dublin, on 22 December 1740. He was educated at Mr. Gast's school in his native city and at Trinity College Dublin. He was elected a Scholar of Trinity in 1759, graduated B.A. in 1761, and gained a fellowship in 1763. Having taken orders, Stock retired to the college living of Conwall in the diocese of Raphoe.

In 1793 he was collated prebendary of Lismore, but resigned this preferment in 1795, on his appointment to the head-mastership of Portora Royal School, Enniskillen. In January 1798 he succeeded John Porter as Bishop of Killala and Achonry. Shortly after his consecration, and while holding his first visitation at the castle of Killala, the bishop became a prisoner of the French army under General Jean Joseph Amable Humbert (his sons also had been briefly captured when they rowed out to view the ships), when French forces landed in support of the Irish Rebellion of 1798. In 1810 Stock was translated to the Diocese of Waterford and Lismore, and died at Waterford on 13 August 1813. His memorial in Waterford Cathedral was created by James Tyley of Bristol.

== Works ==
Stock was a classical scholar, a linguist, and a man of general culture. In 1776 he published anonymously a life of George Berkeley, subsequently republished in the Biographia Britannica, the only memoir on Berkeley based on contemporary information. Of his experiences as a prisoner of the French he left a partial record in his private diary—23 Aug. to 15 September 1798—which was printed in William Hamilton Maxwell's History of the Rebellion of 1798, and in two letters to his brother Stephen, published in the Auckland Correspondence (iv. 46–51). In 1799 he published a more complete account of the French invasion of County Mayo in his Narrative of what passed at Killala in the Summer of 1798. By an Eyewitness. The impartiality of this work is said to have been a bar to the bishop's advancement

He wrote also:

- ‘The Book of the Prophet Isaiah in Hebrew and English, with Notes,’ Bath, 1803.
- ‘The Book of Job metrically arranged and newly translated into English, with Notes,’ Bath, 1805.

He also published school editions of Tacitus and Demosthenes, and was an active contributor to the controversial theology of his day. He left two manuscript volumes of correspondence which are preserved in the library of Trinity College, Dublin. They consist chiefly of letters written from Killala and Waterford between 1806 and 1813 to his son Henry in Dublin.

== Family ==
He was twice married. He and his first wife, Mrs. Catherine Palmer, a sister of William Newcome, and widow of Patrick Palmer, had ten children, of whom the most distinguished was Joseph Stock, MP for Cashel and Serjeant-at-law (Ireland). He married, secondly, in 1795, only ten weeks after his first wife's death, a widow named Mary Obins. There appears to have been a strain of mental instability in the Stock family, as several of the Bishop's children and grandchildren suffered from serious psychological problems.
