= John Lanigan (politician) =

John Lanigan MP

Member of Parliament for Cashel
- In office 6 May 1859 – 15 July 1865
- Preceded by: Timothy O'Brien
- Succeeded by: James O'Beirne

Personal details
- Born: 1803
- Died: 1868 (aged 64–65)
- Party: Liberal

John Lanigan (1803 – 1868) was an Irish Liberal politician.

He was elected as the Member of Parliament (MP) for Cashel at the 1859 general election but was defeated at the next general election, in 1865.

Lanigan married Mary Ann O'Keeffe (Charles O'Keeffe and Letitia (Yelverton) O'Keeffe) they had two sons Charles O'Keeffe Lanigan and Stephen Charles William O'Keeffe Lanigan. He died on the 25th of August 1868 in Templemore, County Tipperary, and is buried in Glasnevin, Dublin.

Parliament of the United Kingdom
Preceded by Timothy O'Brien	Member of Parliament for Cashel; 1859 – 1865	Succeeded by James O'Beirne
