= The Digital Hub =

Cluster of tech companies in Dublin, Ireland

Coordinates: 53.344°N 6.284°W

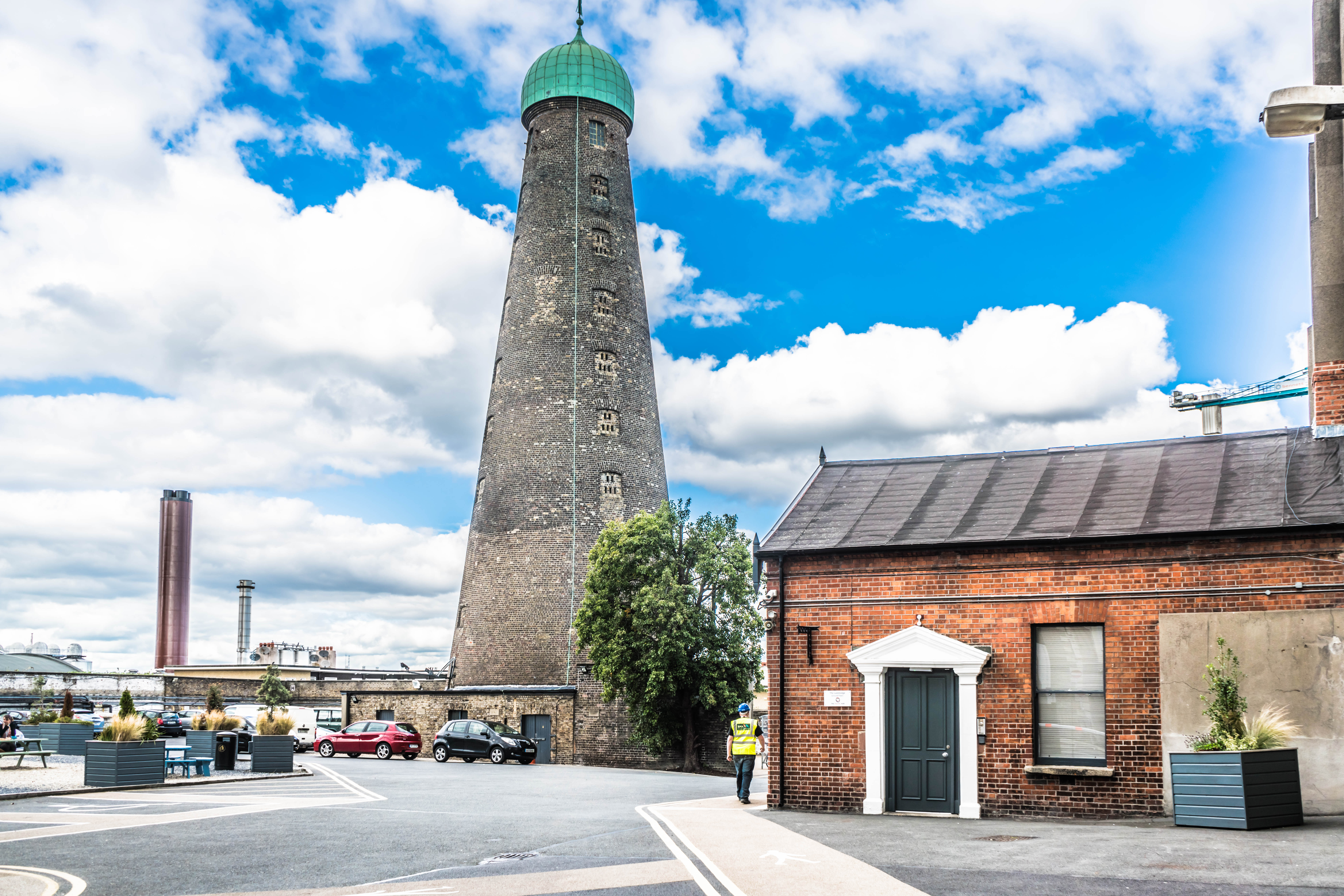
St. Patrick's Tower and the Gatelodge building at The Digital Hub

The Digital Hub is a cluster of technology, digital media and internet companies in The Liberties area of Dublin, Ireland. As of 2017, the hub consisted of over 70 companies located in eight buildings, collectively employing 700 people. As of 2021, there 30 companies employing 270 people.

== History ==
The Irish Government founded The Digital Hub in 2003 to cater for companies involved in information technology, with Media Lab Europe—a business venture by MIT— as its anchor. In 2016, Fiach Mac Conghail, former director of the Abbey Theatre, was appointed CEO of the Digital Hub Development Agency, the state agency which operates and promotes The Digital Hub.

By 2017, nearly 100 companies were located there. At that time, current and former tenants included Amazon, Etsy, Havok, Houghton Mifflin Harcourt, Lonely Planet, Eventbrite, Slack, and Stripe. By April 2021, the number of tenant companies had dropped to 30.

In mid-2021, the Irish government announced that it would wind down the Digital Hub and transfer land to the Land Development Agency (LDA). The LDA stated in 2023 that it intended to develop the site into a mixed-use development called 'Pear Tree Crossing'. A message on the 'Pear Tree Crossing' website, dated to late 2024, stated that in December 2024 an "enabling planning application" had been submitted covering a small part of the site to "facilitate [..] archaeological testing".
