= George Roe =

Irish businessman and politician (1796–1863)

Lord Mayor of Dublin
- In office 1842–1843
- Preceded by: Daniel O'Connell
- Succeeded by: Timothy O'Brien

Personal details
- Born: 1796 Booterstown, Dublin, Ireland
- Died: 27 December 1863 (aged 66–67) Torquay, England
- Resting place: Mount Jerome Cemetery
- Party: Whig
- Spouse: Mary Franklin (m. 1819)

George Roe (1796 – 20 July 1863) was an Irish businessman and Whig politician.

George Roe was born in Booterstown, County Dublin, to Peter and Margaret Roe in 1796. The Roe family played a key role in the history of the Liberties in Dublin. In 1819, he married Mary Franklin. He inherited a distillery on Thomas Street from his father in the 1820s, and he amalgamated it with another family distillery in Pimlico. The combined distillery became known as George Roe & Co, and it covered over 17 acres (6.9 ha) from Thomas Street to the River Liffey. By 1887, George Roe & Co was the largest producer of whiskey in Europe.

Roe was a member of Dublin Corporation, and he succeeded Daniel O'Connell as Lord Mayor of Dublin in 1842. He was a friend of O'Connell's and a supporter of Catholic emancipation. A Liberal in politics, he was a justice of the peace, deputy lieutenant for Dublin City and chief magistrate. He was appointed to the Wide Streets Commission in 1847, and was High Sheriff of the city in the same year. Roe's main residence was at Nutley on the Stillorgan Road, now the home of Elm Park Golf club.

Due to ill health, Roe retired from both the distillery and his public offices in the 1860s. Advised by his doctors, George and Mary Roe moved to milder climates in Torquay in Devon, where he died on 20 July 1863. His remains were returned to Dublin for burial in Mount Jerome Cemetery. After his death, the distillery was inherited by his nephews, Henry and George Roe.

In 2018, Diageo converted the former Guinness power house on Thomas Street into a new distillery, where they produce a whiskey called Roe & Co in honour of George Roe. Diageo also restored the Roe tomb in Mount Jerome Cemetery.

Civic offices
Preceded by Daniel O'Connell	Lord Mayor of Dublin; 1842–1843	Succeeded by Timothy O'Brien
