= Joseph Stock (MP) =

Irish Whig politician, barrister, Law Officer and judge

Member of Parliament for Cashel
- In office 14 July 1838 – 5 February 1846
- Preceded by: Conway Richard Dobbs
- Succeeded by: Wellington Stapleton-Cotton

Personal details
- Born: 1789
- Died: 30 October 1855 (aged 65–66)
- Party: Whig
- Parent(s): Joseph Stock, Catherine Palmer
- Education: Trinity College Dublin

Joseph Stock (1789 – 30 October 1855) was an Irish Whig politician, barrister, Law Officer and judge. He was Irish Serjeant-at-law and served as the Admiralty judge 1838-1855.

He was one of the ten children of Joseph Stock, Bishop of Killala and Achonry and his first wife Catherine Palmer (née Newcome) widow of Patrick Palmer and sister of William Newcome, Archbishop of Armagh.

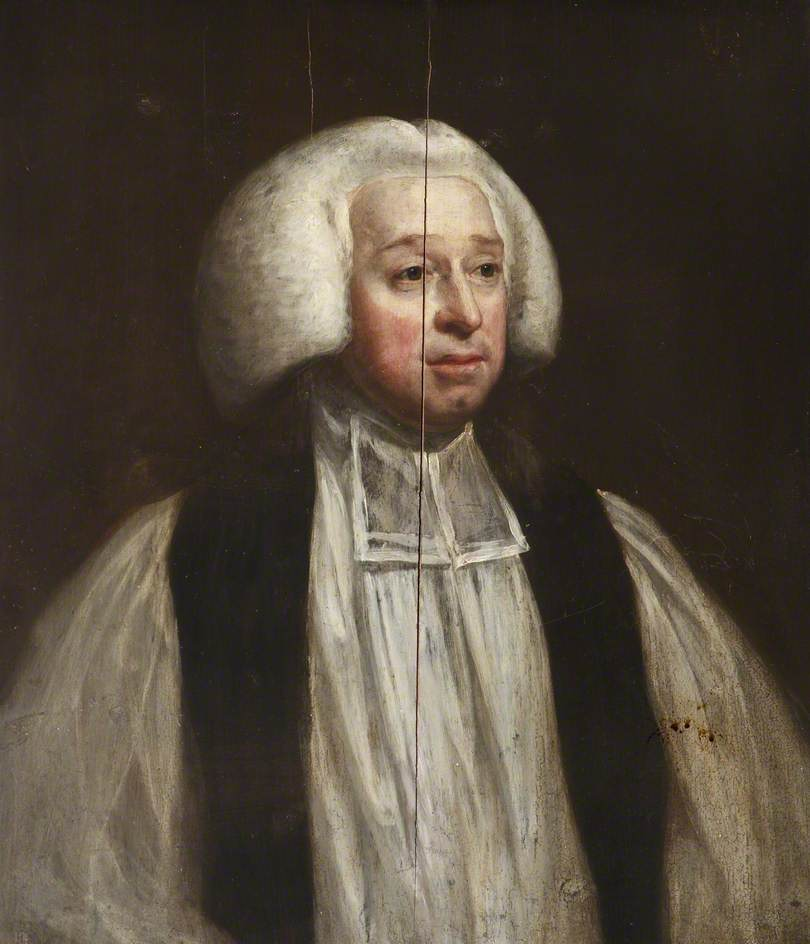
Joseph's maternal uncle, Archbishop Newcome

He studied law at Trinity College Dublin and was called to the Bar in 1812. He became Third Serjeant-at-law (Ireland) in 1840, Second Serjeant in 1841 and First Serjeant in 1842. Unusually for a Serjeant-at-law he was also a sitting judge, having been appointed the judge of the Irish Admiralty Court in 1838. He served as the Admiralty judge until his death. His election to Parliament a few months later did not, as might have been expected, disqualify him from continuing as a judge, since the House of Commons Disqualification Act, barring judges from sitting in Parliament, did not, apparently through a drafting anomaly, apply to him. It was generally agreed that he was a highly qualified candidate, who had extensive experience in the field of Admiralty law, and his appointment was well received, apart from some concerns that he would not be an energetic reformer, which was considered to be of vital importance since the Court was agreed by practitioners to be in desperate need of an overhaul. However his triple role as MP, Serjeant-at-law and judge meant that within a year or two he became very much a part-time judge. He delegated much of the work to subordinates, and began the previously unknown practice of delivering judgments ex tempore.

He lived at Temple Street, Dublin. He never married, and at his death, his substantial fortune was divided between his relatives.

Stock was elected Whig MP for Cashel at a by-election in 1838—caused by the appointment of Stephen Woulfe as Chief Baron of the Irish Exchequer—and held the seat until 1846 when he resigned by accepting the office of Steward of the Chiltern Hundreds.

Parliament of the United Kingdom
Preceded by Stephen Woulfe	Member of Parliament for Cashel; 1838–1846	Succeeded by Timothy O'Brien
