= St Patricks Tower =

Former windmill in Dublin, Ireland

Coordinates: 53.34401°N 6.28408°W

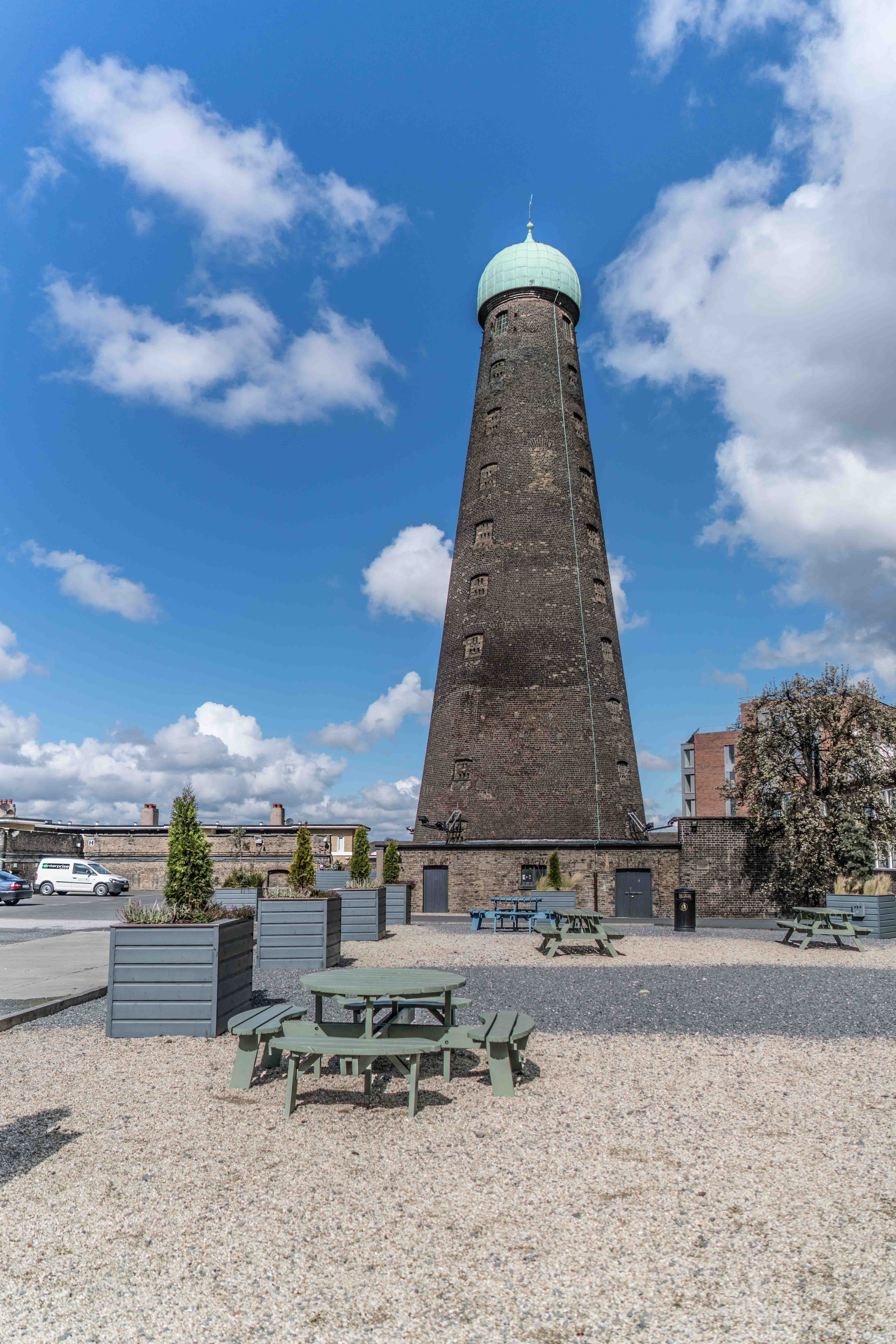
St. Patrick's Tower

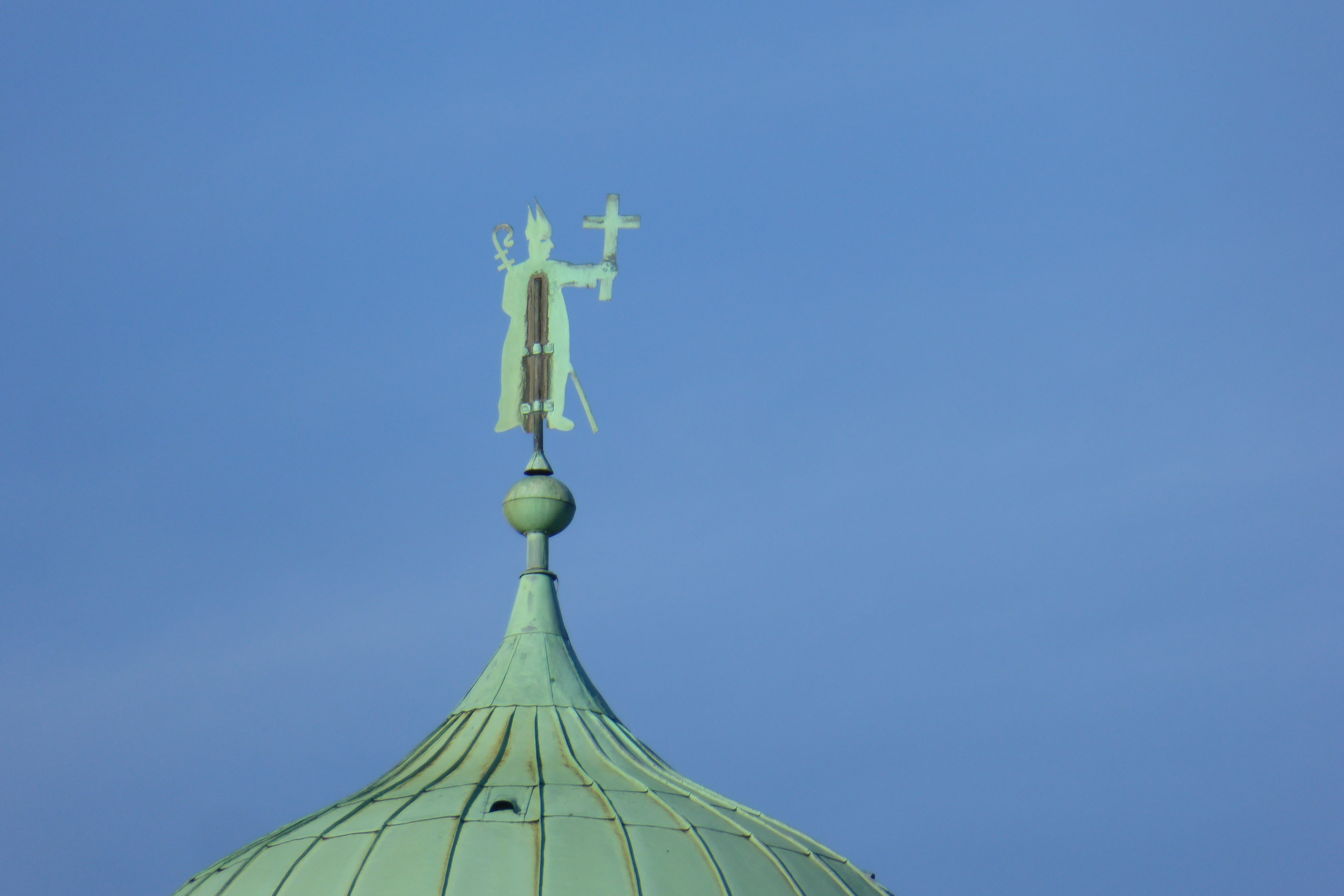
Weathervane

St Patricks Tower is a former smock windmill that was built to power the Thomas Street Distillery in Dublin, Ireland. It is on Thomas Street, near the corner with Watling Street and is now part of The Digital Hub. The structure is included in the Record of Protected Structures maintained by Dublin City Council.

The mill was built in 1757 and rebuilt in 1815. A weathervane at the top of the structure includes a representation of Saint Patrick holding a crozier. This figure and the tower's copper cupola were added in the late 19th century. The tower's name derives from these additions.
