= William Carr Buckworth =

Irish politician

William Carr Buckworth was an Irish politician.

Buckworth was born in Cashel and educated at Trinity College, Dublin.

Buckworth was MP for the Irish constituency of Cashel from 1739 until 1753.
