= Roe & Co Distillery =

Irish whiskey distillery

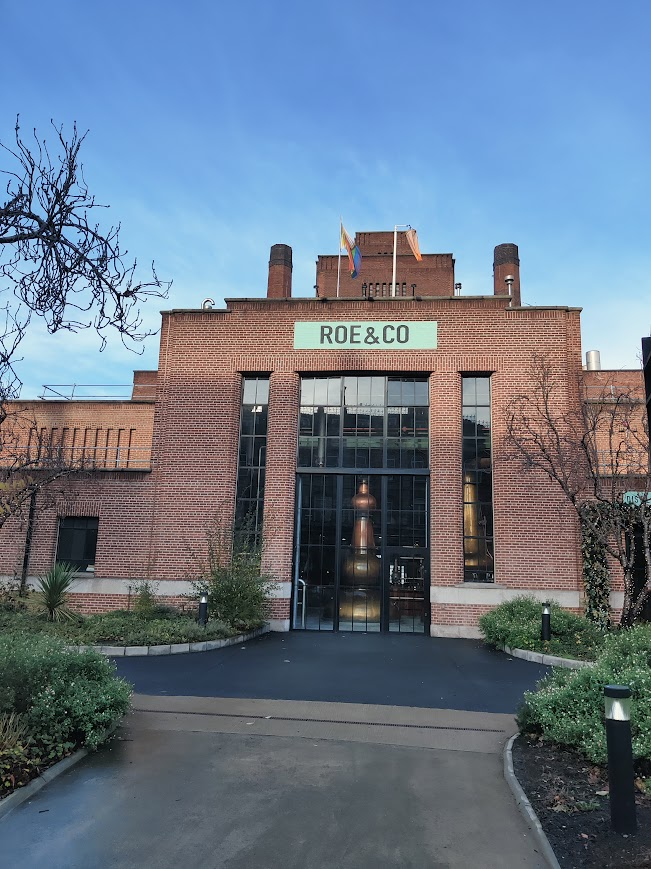
- Roe & Co. Distillery, 2025.
- Location: Thomas Street, Dublin, Ireland
- Coordinates: 53°20′38.5″N 6°17′02.8″W
- Owner: Diageo
- Founded: 2019
- Status: Operating
- Website: roeandcowhiskey.com

Roe & Co
- Type: Blended Irish whiskey
- Cask type(s): Bourbon Casks
- ABV: 45%

Roe & Co Distillery is an Irish whiskey distillery established in 2019, owned by Diageo. It is located on Thomas Street, Dublin, Ireland, near the Guinness' St. James' Gate brewery. The company's name is a tribute to George Roe, a historic Irish distiller.

== History ==
The Thomas Street Distillery, run by the Roe Family, was once the largest in Britain and Ireland, with an output of two million gallons per annum at its peak. It was located opposite Guinness' St. James' Gate brewery. After the distillery closed in 1926, some of its buildings were purchased and incorporated into the Guinness Brewery.

In January 2017, Diageo, producers of Guinness, announced that they would invest €25 million in establishing a new distillery in the old brewery power house building on Thomas Street, close to the site of the original Thomas Street Distillery.

In June 2019, production at the new distillery started.

In March 2019, Roe & Co started its U.S. launch in Massachusetts, Connecticut, Rhode Island, New Jersey, Maryland, and Washington, DC.

Roe & Co Distillery was named Ireland's Visitor attraction of the year and Brand innovator of the year at the Icons of Whisky Awards 2025.

== Products ==
Diageo resurrected the original brand and launched a non-chill filtered, 45% ABV premium blended whiskey under the name "Roe & Co" in March 2017.
