= Sir Timothy O'Brien, 1st Baronet =

Irish politician (1787–1862)

Sir Timothy O'Brien Bt

Member of Parliament for Cashel
- In office 5 February 1846 – 6 May 1859
- Preceded by: Joseph Stock
- Succeeded by: John Lanigan

Lord Mayor of Dublin
- In office 1849–1850
- Preceded by: Jeremiah Dunne
- Succeeded by: John Reynolds
- In office 1844–1845
- Preceded by: George Roe
- Succeeded by: John L. Arabin

Personal details
- Born: 1787
- Died: 3 December 1862 (aged 75)
- Party: Whig
- Other political affiliations: Independent Irish (1852–1857); Repeal Association (1846–1848)
- Children: Sir Patrick O'Brien, 2nd Baronet (son)

Sir Timothy O'Brien, 1st Baronet (1787 – 3 December 1862) was an Irish Whig, Independent Irish Party and Repeal Association politician, and merchant.

He was the son of Timothy O'Brien and his wife (née Madden). In 1821, he married Catherine Murphy, daughter of Edward Murphy, and they had at least five children: Timothy (died 1869); John (died 1869); Kate (died 1894); Ellen (died 1899); and Patrick (1823–1895).

In 1844, O'Brien was made Lord Mayor of Dublin, a position he again held in 1849. Simultaneously, he was a Member of Parliament (MP), first elected as a Repeal Association member for Cashel at a by-election in 1846—caused by the resignation of Joseph Stock. Becoming an Independent Irish MP in 1852 and a Whig in 1857, he held the seat until the 1859 general election, when he did not seek re-election.

In 1849, during Queen Victoria's first visit to Ireland, O'Brien was made a baronet, becoming 1st baronet of Merrion Square and Boris-in-Ossory. Upon his own death in 1862, the baronetcy was inherited by his son, Patrick O'Brien.

Outside of his political career, O'Brien was also a Justice of the Peace and a Deputy Lieutenant.

Parliament of the United Kingdom
Preceded by Joseph Stock	Member of Parliament for Cashel; 1846–1859	Succeeded by John Lanigan
Civic offices
Preceded by George Roe	Lord Mayor of Dublin; 1844–1845	Succeeded by John L. Arabin
Preceded by Jeremiah Dunne	Lord Mayor of Dublin; 1849–1850	Succeeded by John Reynolds
Baronetage of the United Kingdom
New creation	Baronet (of Merrion Square and Boris-in-Ossory); 1849–1862	Succeeded by Patrick O'Brien
