= Cashel (Parliament of Ireland constituency) =

Pre-1801 Irish constituency

- Former borough constituency for the Irish House of Commons
- County: County Tipperary
- Borough: Cashel

–1801
- Seats: 2
- Replaced by: Cashel (UKHC)

Cashel was a constituency represented in the Irish House of Commons until its abolition on 1 January 1801. It returned two members to the Parliament of Ireland to 1800.

== Borough ==
This constituency was the parliamentary borough of Cashel, County Tipperary.

== History ==
In the Patriot Parliament of 1689 summoned by James II, Cashel was represented with two members. Following the Acts of Union 1800 the borough retained one parliamentary seat in the United Kingdom House of Commons.

== Members of Parliament ==
- 1585 Denis Conway and Patrick Kearney
- 1613–1615 John Sale and Dr John Haley
- 1634–1635 Thomas Little and Dr John Haley
- 1639–1649 Thomas Little (died and replaced 1640 by Richard Haley (recorder)) and Patrick Boyton
- 1661–1666 Richard Le Hunte and Eliah Greene

=== 1689–1801 ===
Election	First MP	Second MP
1689	Denis Kearney	James Hackett
1692	Samuel Greene	Samuel Hughes
1695	Samuel Greene	Anthony Maude
1703	Samuel Greene	Kingsmill Pennefather
1710	Matthew Pennefather	Kingsmill Pennefather
1715	Matthew Pennefather	Richard Buckworth
1734	Richard Pennefather	Richard Buckworth
1739	Richard Pennefather	William Carr Buckworth
1753	Richard Pennefather	Kingsmill Pennefather
1771	Richard Pennefather	William Pennefather
1777	Richard Pennefather	William Pennefather
1783	Richard Pennefather	William Pennefather
1798	Richard Pennefather	Joseph Lysaght
1799	Richard Pennefather	Richard Bagwell
1801	Succeeded by the Westminster constituency Cashel	

== Bibliography ==
- O'Hart, John (2007). The Irish and Anglo-Irish Landed Gentry: When Cromwell came to Ireland. Vol. II. Heritage Books. ISBN 0-7884-1927-7.
- Leigh Rayment's historical List of Members of the Irish House of Commons. Cites: Johnston-Liik, Edith Mary (2002). The History of the Irish Parliament 1692-1800 (6 volumes). Ulster Historical Foundation.
