= Marrowbone Lane =

Street in Dublin, Ireland

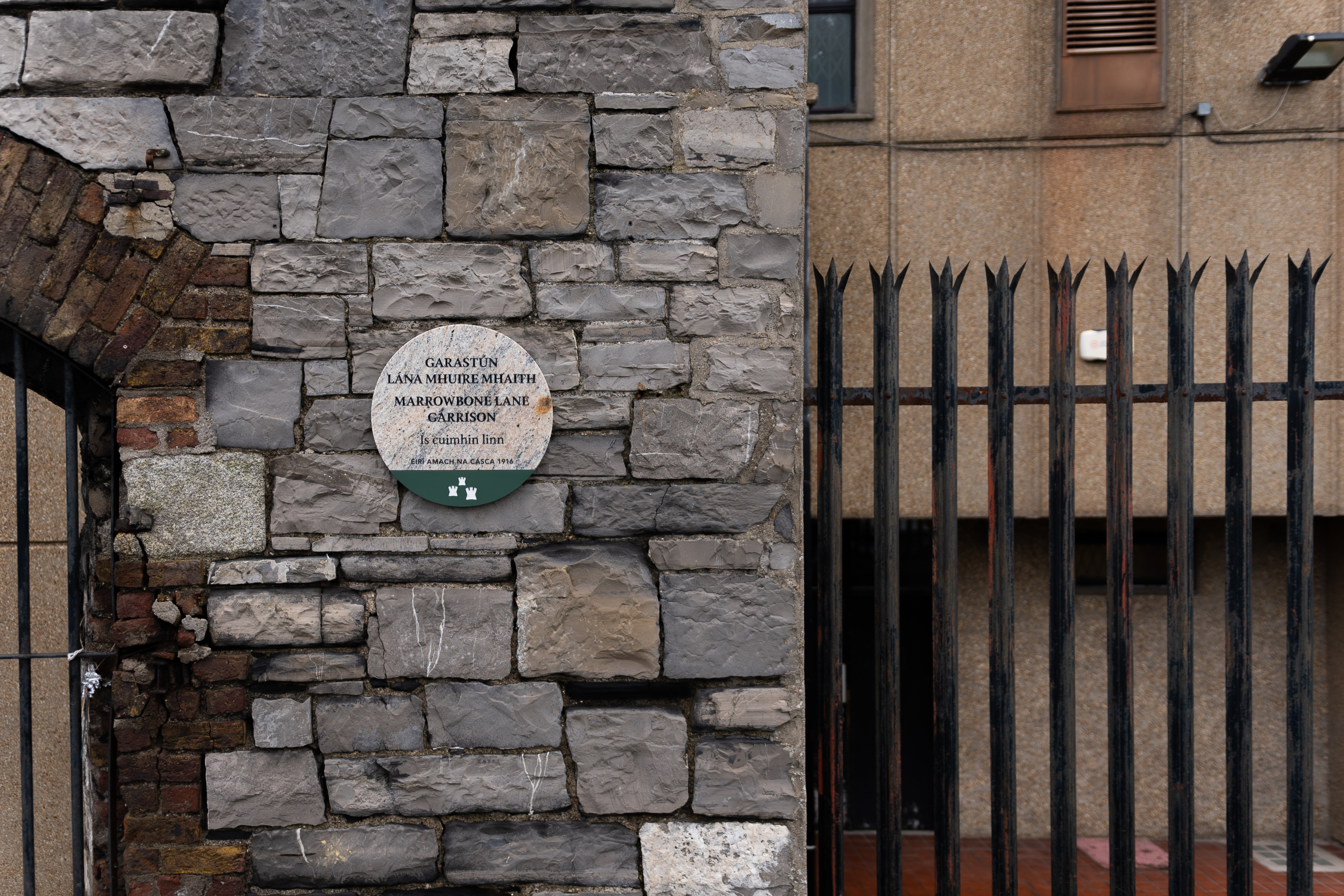
- Sign commemorating the Marrowbone Lane Garrison of 1916

- Location within Central Dublin
- Native name: Lána Mhuire Mhaith (Irish)
- Part of: The Liberties
- Namesake: Marylebone
- Length: 700 m (2,300 ft)
- Width: variable, up to 20 metres (66 ft)
- Location: Dublin, Ireland
- Postal code: D08
- Coordinates: 53.339949°N 6.285764°W
- north end: Thomas Court, School Street, Earl Street South
- south end: Cork Street

Other
- Known for: distillery, infirmary, Easter Rising

Marrowbone Lane (Irish: Lána Mhuire Mhaith) is a street off Cork Street on the south side of Dublin, Ireland.

== History ==
=== Naming convention ===
The street is likely named after Marylebone in London; Pimlico is located right next to it, and other London-inspired street names are nearby, like Spitalfields. These were brought to Dublin by London wool-workers, who settled in the area after William III's conquest of Ireland in 1690. Marylebone, London, commonly pronounced like "Marrow-bone", is named after the church of St Mary at the Bourne, later corrupted to "Mary le Bone", Middle French for "Mary the Good." The Irish street name reproduces this error, literally meaning "Lane of Mary the Good." By 1743, the street name was corrupted to Marrowbone Lane.

=== Easter Rising ===
Fighting took place on the street during the Easter Rising of 1916. The distillery was used as a strongpoint by a force of more than a hundred rebels under the command of Éamonn Ceannt, which also held the nearby South Dublin Union. Ceannt was executed by the British authorities after the rising's failure. His second-in-command was Cathal Brugha, and other participants included W. T. Cosgrave, Joseph McGrath and Denis O'Brien.

In describing the careers of participants, the terms "fought at Marrowbone Lane" and "fought at the South Dublin Union" are used interchangeably.

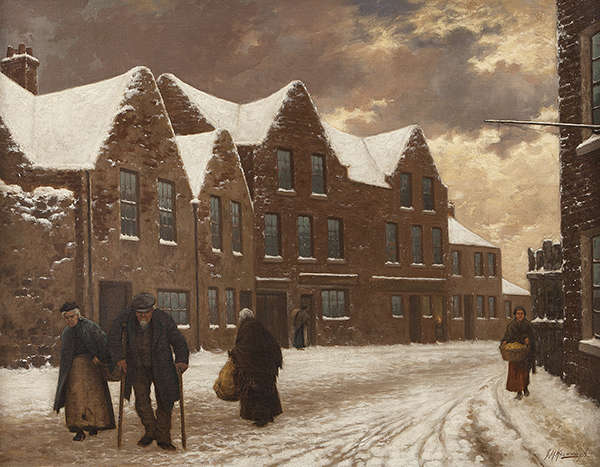
Painting of Marrowbone Lane, Joseph Malachy Kavanagh, c. 1876–1918.

=== Popular culture ===
In 1939, the story and history of Marrowbone Lane was immortalized in a play of the same name which was written by Robert Collis and produced and directed by Michael Mac Liammoir and Hilton Edwards. Among the cast was a young Wilfred Bramble, who was later to find TV fame in the UK as Steptoe, in Steptoe & Son. The play depicts the hardship of tenement life in Dublin in typical areas like Marrowbone Lane. It tells the story of a young girl from Mayo who marries into a tenement family and is appalled at the living conditions she and her baby will have to endure. ‘Marrowbone Lane’ was first performed at the Gate Theatre in Dublin on the 10th of October 1939

=== Built heritage ===
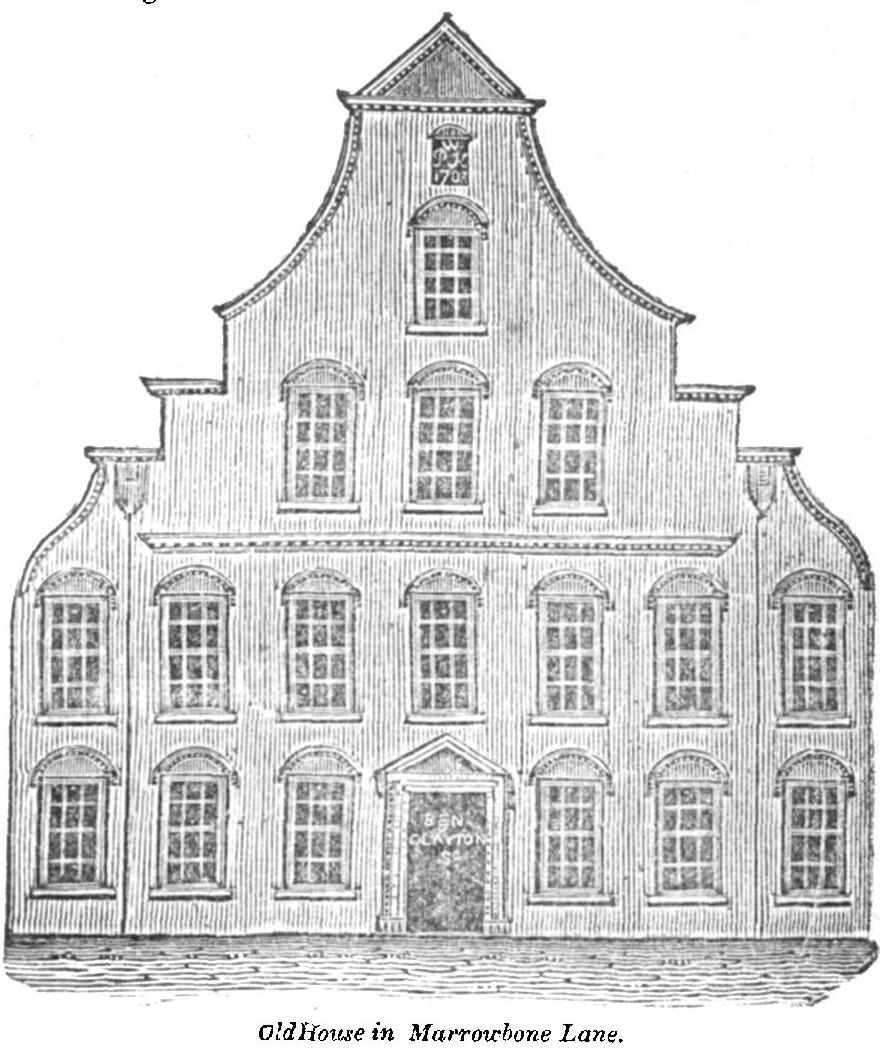
Old House in Marrowbone Lane from an illustration stating it was taken down in 1813.

In the mid-17th century linen and silk weavers were a prominent section of the Dublin population. They were mostly French Huguenot, Dutch and Flemish immigrants and lived in the areas around The Coombe including Marrowbone Lane. The emergence of the ‘Dutch Billy’ style of housing was attributed to these workers. This type of housing had many distinctive features and characteristics one of which being the roof ridges that ran at right angles to the street. These residences were constructed of brick and were designed to stand in terraces. Another feature that could be seen in these homes was the shared chimney stacks. This feature was due to the placement of fireplaces in the corner of two neighboring houses resulting in a shared chimney stack. These houses with their unique architecture at the time were common in Marrowbone Lane and the surrounding area, but many have since vanished or have been demolished. However, up to the 1980’s there remained a few examples in Marrowbone Lane and the surrounding streets.

Marrowbone Lane is notable for what the National Inventory of Architectural Heritage describes as an "elegant early social housing scheme", designed by Dublin Corporation's Housing Architect Herbert George Simms, and built in the late 1930s, with curved corners that respond to the curve of Marrowbone Lane. "It is an excellent example of early modernist architecture which employed materials historically used in the area. H.G. Simms was the housing architect of Dublin Corporation from 1932 until 1948. During his time in office, Simms was responsible for the design of some 17,000 new homes."

== See also ==
- List of streets and squares in Dublin
