= James O'Beirne (politician) =

James O'Beirne MP

Member of Parliament for Cashel
- In office 15 July 1865 – 22 February 1869
- Preceded by: John Lanigan
- Succeeded by: Constituency disenfranchised

Personal details
- Born: 1820
- Died: 1895 (aged 74–75)
- Party: Liberal

James Lyster O'Beirne (1820 – 1895) was an Irish Liberal politician.

He was elected as the Member of Parliament (MP) for Cashel at the 1865 general election and held the seat until 1869, when his victory at the 1868 general election was declared void on account of bribery The seat was then disenfranchised and absorbed into County Tipperary.

Parliament of the United Kingdom
Preceded by John Lanigan	Member of Parliament for Cashel; 1865 – 1869	Constituency disenfranchised
