= Thomas Street Distillery =

Former distillery in Dublin, Ireland

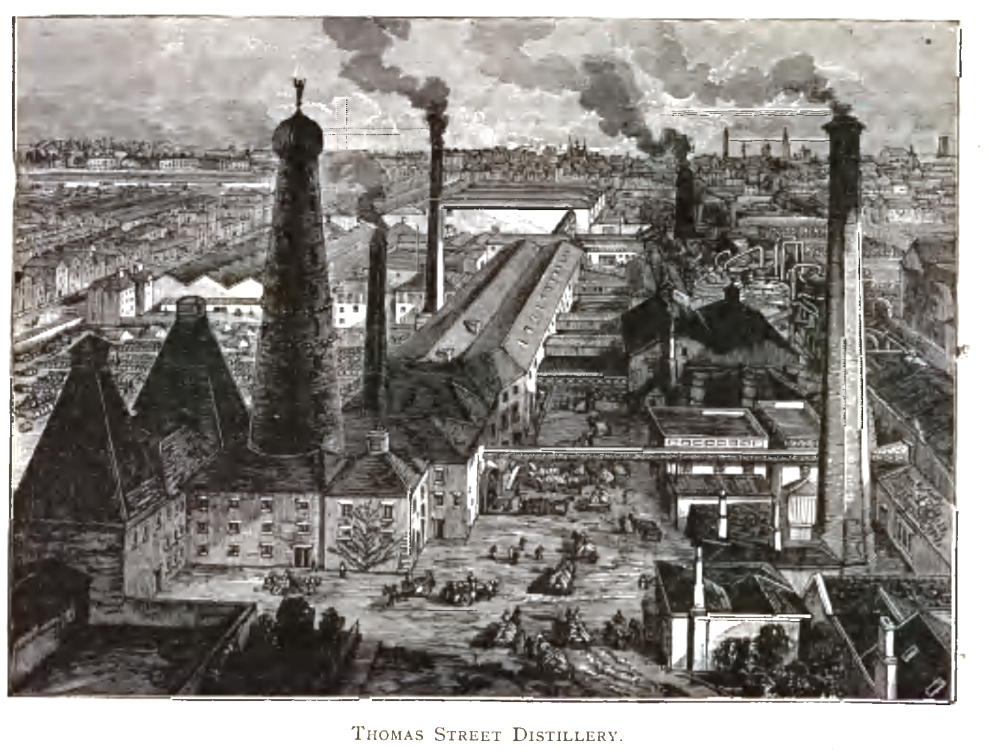
- Location: Dublin
- Coordinates: 53°20′38.5″N 6°17′02.8″W
- Owner: George Roe & Co.
- Founded: 1757
- Founder: Peter Roe
- Status: Defunct
- Water source: River Vartry, Grand Canal
- No. of stills: 8 pot stills (12,000–20,000 gallon)
- Capacity: >2 million gallons
- Mothballed: 1923

Roe & Co
- Type: Dublin Pot Still

The Thomas Street Distillery was an Irish whiskey distillery located in Dublin, Ireland. At its peak, it was Dublin's largest and most productive distillery and with an output of over 2 million gallons per annum, twice that of John Jameson's acclaimed nearby Bow Street distillery.

Alfred Barnard, a British author who visited most of the distilleries in the then United Kingdom of Great Britain and Ireland in the late 1880s, wrote that, at the time of his visit, the Thomas Street Distillery may have been the largest whiskey distillery in the world and probably had the highest output of any whiskey distillery in the British Isles. However, the distillery later entered into financial difficulties, and closed in 1926. Although most of the distillery buildings were demolished following its closure, a few were incorporated into the Guinness St. James's Gate Brewery and are still extant.

In January 2017, Diageo, producers of Guinness, announced that they would invest €25 million in establishing a new distillery in the old brewery power house building on Thomas Street, close to the site of the original Thomas Street Distillery. Production at the new distillery started in the first half of 2019. In addition, Diageo resurrected the original brand and launched a non-chill filtered, 45% ABV premium blended whiskey under the name "Roe & Co" in March 2017.

== History ==
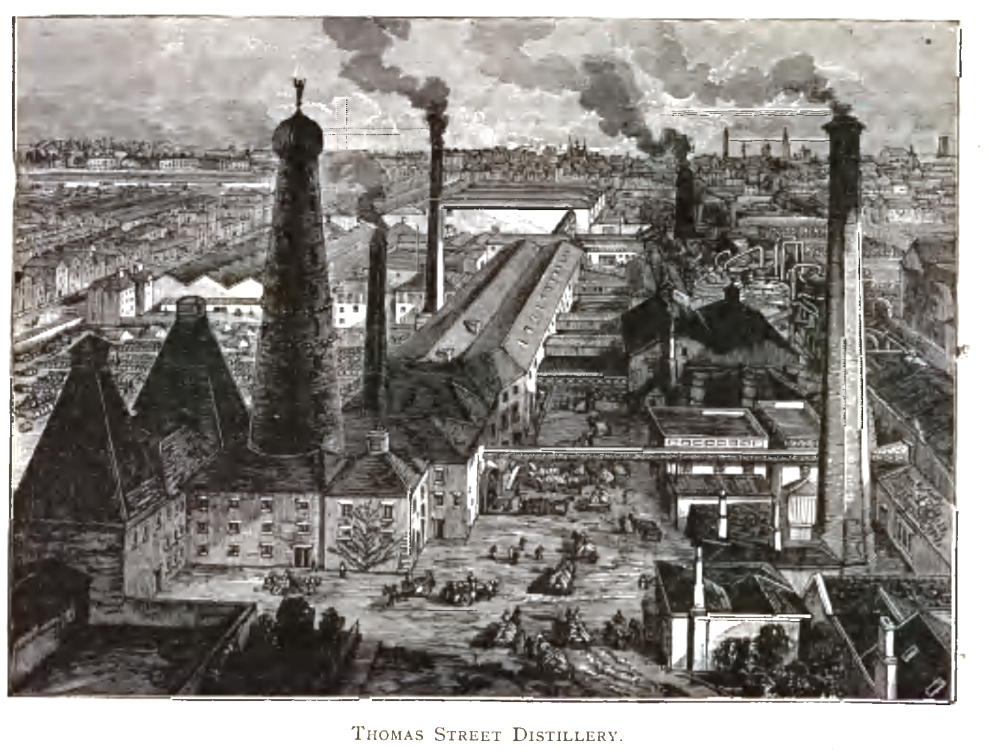
Roe's Thomas Street Distillery, circa. 1892.

In 1757, Peter Roe purchased a small existing distillery on Thomas Street in Dublin. The premises were gradually expanded with rising trade, until the distillery fronted South Earl Street. Richard Roe continued operations at Thomas Street from 1766 to 1794. However, the distilling laws in the then Kingdom of Ireland limited any serious chance of expansion. In 1782, he was operating a still with a capacity of 234 gallons.

In 1784, another member of the Roe family, Nicolas Roe, set up a distillery in Pimlico. This distillery was a larger operation, and was recorded as having a still of 1,165 gallon capacity in 1802, which was replaced by an even larger 1,575 gallon still by 1807. By 1832, George Roe had inherited both of these plants which were near to each other, and expanded them. In addition, he leased additional premises in Mount Brown, which were used as maltings, kilns, and warehouses. By 1827, output of the Thomas Street Distillery was reported as being 244,279 gallons. George Roe's two nephews, Henry and George (which some accounts erroneously refer to as his sons), succeeded to the ownership in 1862, by which point the firm was large and prosperous, and the Roes a family of wealth and influence. So much so that in 1878, the Roes could afford to donate £250,000, a very large sum in those days, to the restoration of Christ Church Cathedral in Dublin, and were knighted for their efforts.

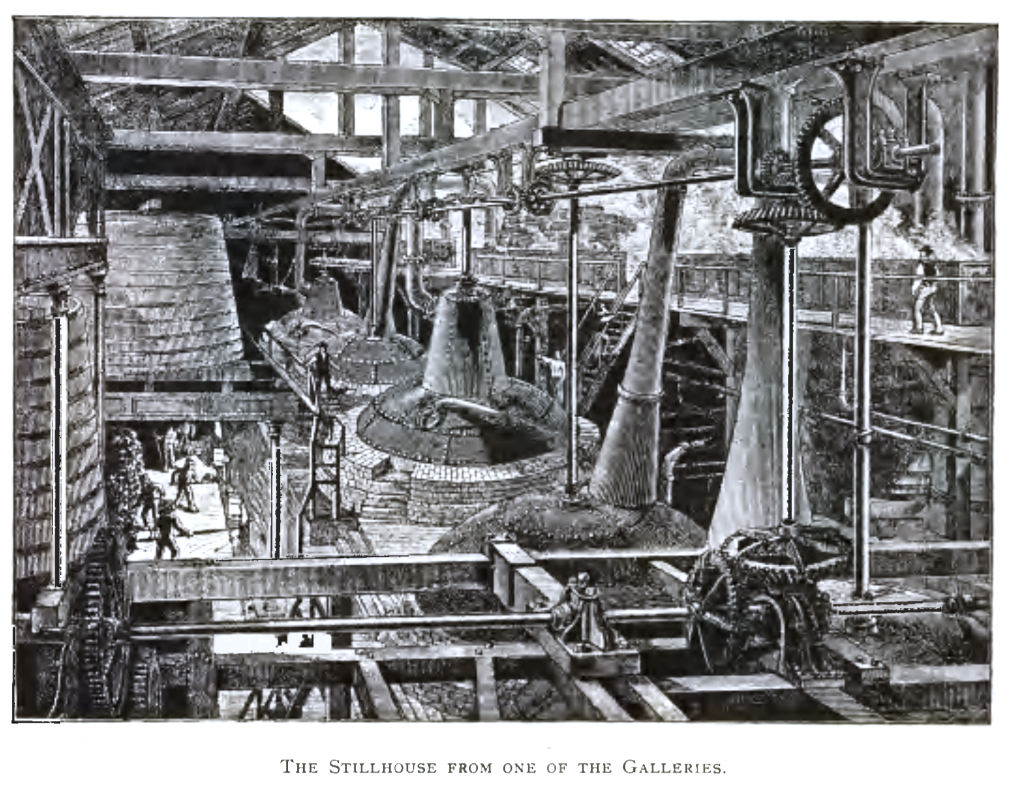
With eight pot stills, the stillhouse at the Thomas Street Distillery was probably the largest in the world.

When Alfred Barnard, the British historian, visited the plant, it was at its zenith, and he described it as being one of the largest and best equipped in the world, occupying 17 acres, with eight pot stills in operation, an output of over 2 million gallons per annum, and a payroll of over 200 staff, including 18 coopers. At the time, its largest export market was across to Great Britain; however, Canada, the United States, and Australia also represented important export markets.

However, by 1891, the distillery was beginning to feel the impact of competition from Scottish distillers, and the company was amalgamated with two other Dublin distilling companies, the Dublin Whiskey Distillery Company's Jones Road Distillery, and William Jameson's Marrowbone Lane Distillery (not to be confused with John Jameson's Bow Street Distillery), to form a distilling behemoth, with a combined potential output of over 3.5 million gallons per annum. However, following the loss of both the American and British Commonwealth export markets during prohibition and the Anglo-Irish trade war in the 1920s, the company suffered severe financial difficulties, and both the Thomas Street and Marrowbone Lane distilleries closed in 1923, with the Jones Road Distillery following suit in 1926, though distilling may have continued at Jones Road until 1946.

Following its closure, many of the buildings were demolished in stages. However, a portion of the site was purchased by the neighbouring Guinness Brewery at St. James's Gate, and some of the buildings are still in existence, including the landmark St. Patrick's Tower.

During the 1916 Easter Rising, both Roe's Distillery and the nearby Jameson Distillery at Marrowbone Lane were used as outposts by the Irish rebels.

== St Patrick's Tower ==
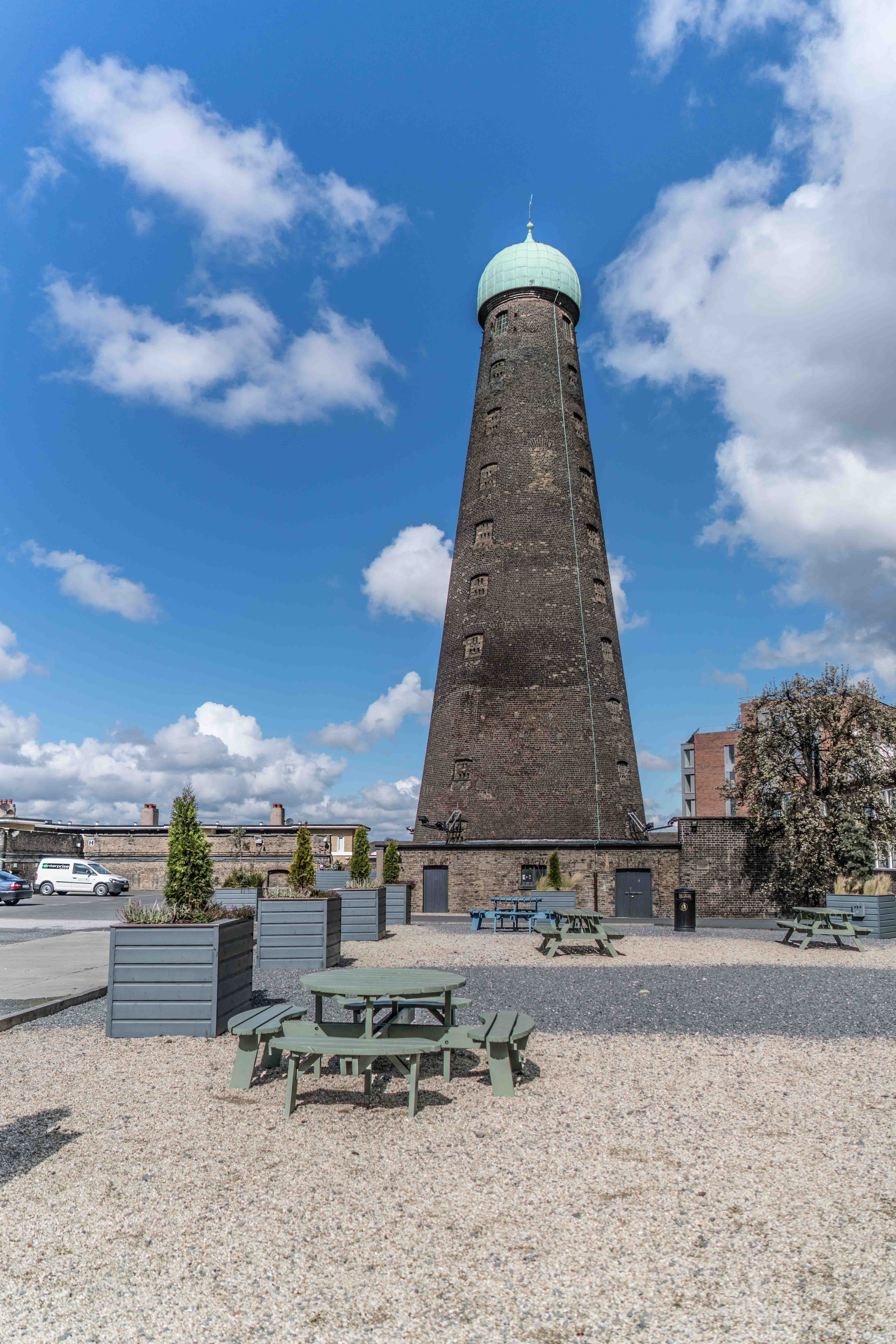
St. Patrick's Tower, now on the grounds of the Guinness Brewery was once part of the Thomas Street Distillery

Constructed in 1757, the year Peter Roe purchased the small distillery on Thomas Street, St. Patrick's Tower is a 150 ft high brick-built windmill which is believed to be one of the oldest extant smock windmills in Europe. Once sited on the grounds of the Thomas Street distillery, it is now part of the Digital Hub complex.

== See also ==
- Irish whiskey
- Irish whiskey brands

=== Bibliography ===
- McGuire, E.B. (1973). Irish Whiskey: a History of Distilling, the Spirit Trade, and Excise Controls in Ireland. Dublin: Gill and MacMillan. ISBN 0064947017.
- Townsend, Brian (1997–1999). The Lost Distilleries of Ireland. Glasgow: Angels' Share (Neil Wilson Publishing). ISBN 1897784872.
