= John Reynolds (Dublin politician) =

Irish politician (1797–1868)

Member of Parliament for Dublin City
- In office 29 July 1847 – 7 July 1852 Serving with Sir Edward Grogan
- Preceded by: William Henry Gregory; Sir Edward Grogan
- Succeeded by: John Vance; Sir Edward Grogan

Lord Mayor of Dublin
- In office 1850–1851
- Preceded by: Timothy O'Brien
- Succeeded by: Benjamin Guinness

Personal details
- Born: 1797
- Died: 21 August 1868 (aged 70–71)
- Resting place: Glasnevin Cemetery
- Party: Repeal Association

John Reynolds (1797 – 21 August 1868) was an Irish Repeal Association politician and businessman. He was a Member of Parliament for Dublin City from the 1847 election to the 1852 election, and Lord Mayor of Dublin in 1850.

He was from a prosperous family; in the 1840s he was secretary of the National Bank of Ireland, while his brother Thomas Reynolds was Dublin City Marshal.

Reynolds regarded the Repeal Association as a vehicle for advancing the local interest of Dublin rather than the constitutional question of repeal of the Acts of Union 1800. The Dublin merchant and trade lobby lost influence in the Association to professional men in the mid-1840s, but regained it after Daniel O'Connell's death in May 1847, with Reynolds, then an alderman, coming to prominence. According to Charles Gavan Duffy, it was proved that Reynolds "accepted money extracted from officers for whom he had procured compensation in Parliament".

His grave is in Glasnevin Cemetery.

Parliament of the United Kingdom
Preceded by William Henry Gregory; Sir Edward Grogan	Member of Parliament for Dublin City; 1847–1852; With: Sir Edward Grogan	Succeeded by John Vance; Sir Edward Grogan
Civic offices
Preceded by Timothy O'Brien	Lord Mayor of Dublin; 1850–1851	Succeeded by Benjamin Guinness
