= Cashel (UK Parliament constituency) =

UK parliamentary constituency in Ireland, 1801 to 1870

- Former borough constituency for the House of Commons
- County: County Tipperary
- Borough: Cashel

1801–1870
- Seats: 1
- Created from: Cashel (IHC)
- Replaced by: County Tipperary

Cashel was a constituency in the House of Commons of the United Kingdom representing the parliamentary borough of Cashel, County Tipperary, Ireland, returning one MP from 1801 to 1870. With Sligo, it was one of two Irish boroughs disfranchised after investigations into corruption.

== History ==
Prior to 1801, the city of Cashel in County Tipperary was a two-seat borough constituency in the Irish House of Commons. Under the Acts of Union 1800, which united the Kingdom of Ireland with the Kingdom of Great Britain to form the United Kingdom, it was one of 33 boroughs to retain representation in the House of Commons of the United Kingdom, but was reduced to one MP. Its first MP in 1801 was chosen by lot.

In December 1831, boundary commissioners proposed boundaries for the borough. It was defined by the Parliamentary Boundaries (Ireland) Act 1832 as:

The whole of the District under the Jurisdiction of the Mayor; and in addition thereto,

The Space which lies between the Boundary of the said Jurisdiction and a straight Line to be drawn from the North-eastern Corner of the Enclosure Wall of the Charter School on the Dublin Road, in a South-easterly Direction, to the Point at which the Southernmost Killenaule Road is met by a Wall which runs thereto from the Northernmost Fethard Road, and which Point is about One hundred and seventy-six Yards North-west of the Point at which the Southernmost Killenaule Road leaves the Northernmost Fethard Road;

And also the Space which lies between the Boundary of the said Jurisdiction and the following Boundary; (that is to say,) From the Point on the West of the Town at which the Boundary of the old Borough is met by a Wall which runs therefrom, first Westward and then Northward, to the Golden Road, Westward, along the said Wall to the Point at which the same meets the Golden Road; thence, Eastward, along the Golden Road (for about Twenty-two Yards) to the Point at which the same is met by a Ditch and Wall at the End of a Porter's Lodge; thence along the said Ditch and Wall (which bend Eastward) for about Seventy Yards; thence along the Continuation of the last-mentioned Ditch, Northward, for about One hundred Yards; thence along a Garden Wall continuing in the same Direction, Northward, for about One hundred and thirty Yards, to the Point at which the same meets a Wall which runs Westward therefrom; thence, Westward, along the last-mentioned Wall (for about Fifty-five Yards) to the Point at which the same meets a Wall which bends round Eastward to the Camas Road; thence along the last-mentioned Wall to the Point at which the same meets the Camas Road; thence along the Road which leads from the Camas Road into the Armel Road to the Point at which the same meets the Boundary of the old Borough.

Following the 1868 general election held on 21 November, there were reports of corruption in the borough. A petition was presented by the losing candidate, alleging corruption. As a result, the election was declared void. A report was taken under the Parliamentary Elections Act 1868. Following the Sligo and Cashel Disfranchisement Act 1870, Cashel lost the right to elect its own MP from 1 August 1870. The area was transferred to form part of the County Tipperary constituency.

== Members of Parliament ==
Robert Peel was later Prime Minister from 1834 to 1835 and from 1841 to 1846.

Election	Member	Party	Note
1801, 1 January	Richard Bagwell		Resigned. Dean of Kilmacduagh, 1804 and Clogher, 1806
1801, 9 December	John Bagwell		
1802, 27 July	Rt Hon. William Wickham	Whig	
1806, 17 November	Viscount Primrose	Whig	
1807, 25 May	Quinton Dick	Tory	Resigned
1809, 15 April	Robert Peel	Tory	
1812, 26 October	Sir Charles Saxton, Bt	Tory	
1818, 9 June	Richard Pennefather	Tory	Resigned
1819, 4 March	Ebenezer John Collett	Tory	
1830, 5 August	Mathew Pennefather	Tory	Resigned
1831, 16 July	Philip Pusey	Tory	
1832, 14 December	James Roe	Repeal Association	
1835, 14 January	Louis Perrin	Whig	Appointed Judge of the Irish Court of Kings Bench
1835, 4 September	Rt Hon. Stephen Woulfe	Whig	Appointed Lord Chief Baron of the Exchequer in Ireland
1838, 14 July	Joseph Stock	Whig	Resigned
1846, 5 February	Sir Timothy O'Brien, Bt	Repeal Association	Re-elected as a Liberal candidate
1852, 15 July	Sir Timothy O'Brien, Bt	Independent Irish	
1857, 3 April	Sir Timothy O'Brien, Bt	Whig	
1859, 6 May	John Lanigan	Liberal	
1865, 17 July	James Lyster O'Briene	Liberal	1868: Election declared void and borough disenfranchised
1870	Constituency abolished		

== Elections ==
=== Elections in the 1830s ===
General election 1830: Cashel
Party	Candidate	Votes	%
Tory	Mathew Pennefather	Unopposed	
Registered electors		26	
Tory hold			

General election 1831: Cashel
Party	Candidate	Votes	%
Tory	Mathew Pennefather	Unopposed	
Registered electors		26	
Tory hold			

Pennefather resigned, causing a by-election.

By-election, 16 July 1831: Cashel
Party	Candidate	Votes	%
Tory	Philip Pusey	Unopposed	
Registered electors		26	
Tory hold			

General election 1832: Cashel
Party	Candidate	Votes	%
Repeal	James Roe (MP)	Unopposed	
Registered electors		277	
Repeal gain from Tory			

General election 1835: Cashel
Party	Candidate	Votes	%
Whig	Louis Perrin	166	74.8
Conservative	Mathew Pennefather	56	25.2
Majority		110	49.6
Turnout		222	68.3
Registered electors		325	
Whig gain from Repeal			

Perrin was appointed as Attorney-General for Ireland, causing a by-election.

By-election, 28 April 1835: Cashel
Party	Candidate	Votes	%
Whig	Louis Perrin	Unopposed	
Registered electors		341	
Whig hold			

Perrin was appointed as a Puisne justice of the King's Bench, causing a by-election.

By-election, 4 September 1835: Cashel
Party	Candidate	Votes	%
Whig	Stephen Woulfe	Unopposed	
Registered electors		351	
Whig hold			

Woulfe was appointed as Solicitor-General for Ireland, requiring a by-election.

By-election, 10 February 1837: Cashel
Party	Candidate	Votes	%
Whig	Stephen Woulfe	Unopposed	
Registered electors		373	
Whig hold			

General election 1837: Cashel
Party	Candidate	Votes	%
Whig	Stephen Woulfe	Unopposed	
Registered electors		353	
Whig hold			

Woulfe was appointed as Lord Chief Baron of the Court of Exchequer in Ireland, causing a by-election.

By-election, 14 July 1838: Cashel
Party	Candidate	Votes	%
Whig	Joseph Stock	Unopposed	
Whig hold			

=== Elections in the 1840s ===
General election 1841: Cashel
Party	Candidate	Votes	%	±%
Whig	Joseph Stock	Unopposed		
Registered electors		267		
Whig hold				

Stock resigned by accepting the office of Steward of the Chiltern Hundreds, causing a by-election.

By-election, 5 February 1846: Cashel
Party	Candidate	Votes	%	±%
Repeal	Timothy O'Brien	Unopposed		
Repeal gain from Whig				

General election 1847: Cashel
Party	Candidate	Votes	%	±%
Repeal	Timothy O'Brien	Unopposed		
Registered electors		172		
Repeal gain from Whig				

=== Elections in the 1850s ===
General election 1852: Cashel
Party	Candidate	Votes	%	±%
Independent Irish	Timothy O'Brien	60	75.9	N/A
Conservative	Charles McGarel	19	24.1	New
Majority		41	51.8	N/A
Turnout		79	71.2	N/A
Registered electors		111		
Independent Irish gain from Repeal		Swing	N/A	

General election 1857: Cashel
Party	Candidate	Votes	%	±%
Whig	Timothy O'Brien	54	42.2	−33.7
Conservative	Charles Hemphill	39	30.5	+6.4
Independent Irish	John Lanigan	35	27.3	−48.6
Majority		15	11.7	N/A
Turnout		128	94.8	+23.6
Registered electors		135		
Whig gain from Independent Irish		Swing	−20.1	

General election 1859: Cashel
Party	Candidate	Votes	%	±%
Liberal	John Lanigan	91	83.5	+56.3
Conservative	John Carden	10	9.2	−21.3
Liberal-Conservative	Charles Hemphill	8	7.3	−23.2
Majority		81	74.3	+62.6
Turnout		109	74.1	−20.7
Registered electors		147		
Liberal hold		Swing	+39.7	

=== Elections in the 1860s ===
General election 1865: Cashel
Party	Candidate	Votes	%	±%
Liberal	James O'Beirne	86	63.7	N/A
Liberal	John Lanigan	49	36.3	−47.2
Majority		37	27.4	−46.9
Turnout		135	92.5	+18.4
Registered electors		146		
Liberal hold		Swing	N/A	

General election 1868: Cashel
Party	Candidate	Votes	%	±%
Liberal	James O'Beirne	100	54.3	−9.4
Liberal	Henry Munster	84	45.7	+9.4
Majority		16	8.6	−18.8
Turnout		184	90.6	−1.9
Registered electors		203		
Liberal hold		Swing	−9.4	

On petition, this election was declared void on account of bribery and the seat was disenfranchised. The seat was absorbed into County Tipperary in 1870.
