= The Whisky Distilleries of the United Kingdom =

1887 book by Alfred Barnard

- Author: Alfred Barnard
- Language: English
- Genre: Non-fiction
- Publisher: Harper's Weekly Gazette
- Publication date: 1887
- Publication place: United Kingdom

The Whisky Distilleries of the United Kingdom is a nonfiction book by British brewing and distilling historian Alfred Barnard, originally published in 1887 by Harper's Weekly Gazette. It served as a description of the state of the whisky producing industry in the United Kingdom, with a particular emphasis on the numerous distilleries of Scotland.

== Background ==
The Whisky Distilleries was originally written by Barnard "to draw attention to the rapid increase of the Whisky Trade", as it was beginning to grow in popularity. He was commissioned to write it by Harper's Weekly Gazette. In order to research the book, Barnard attempted to visit every whisky distillery within the United Kingdom at the time, for a total count of 161, although he only visited four of the ten known English distilleries. He began his research and travels in the spring of 1885 and finished around the end of 1886.

== Contents ==
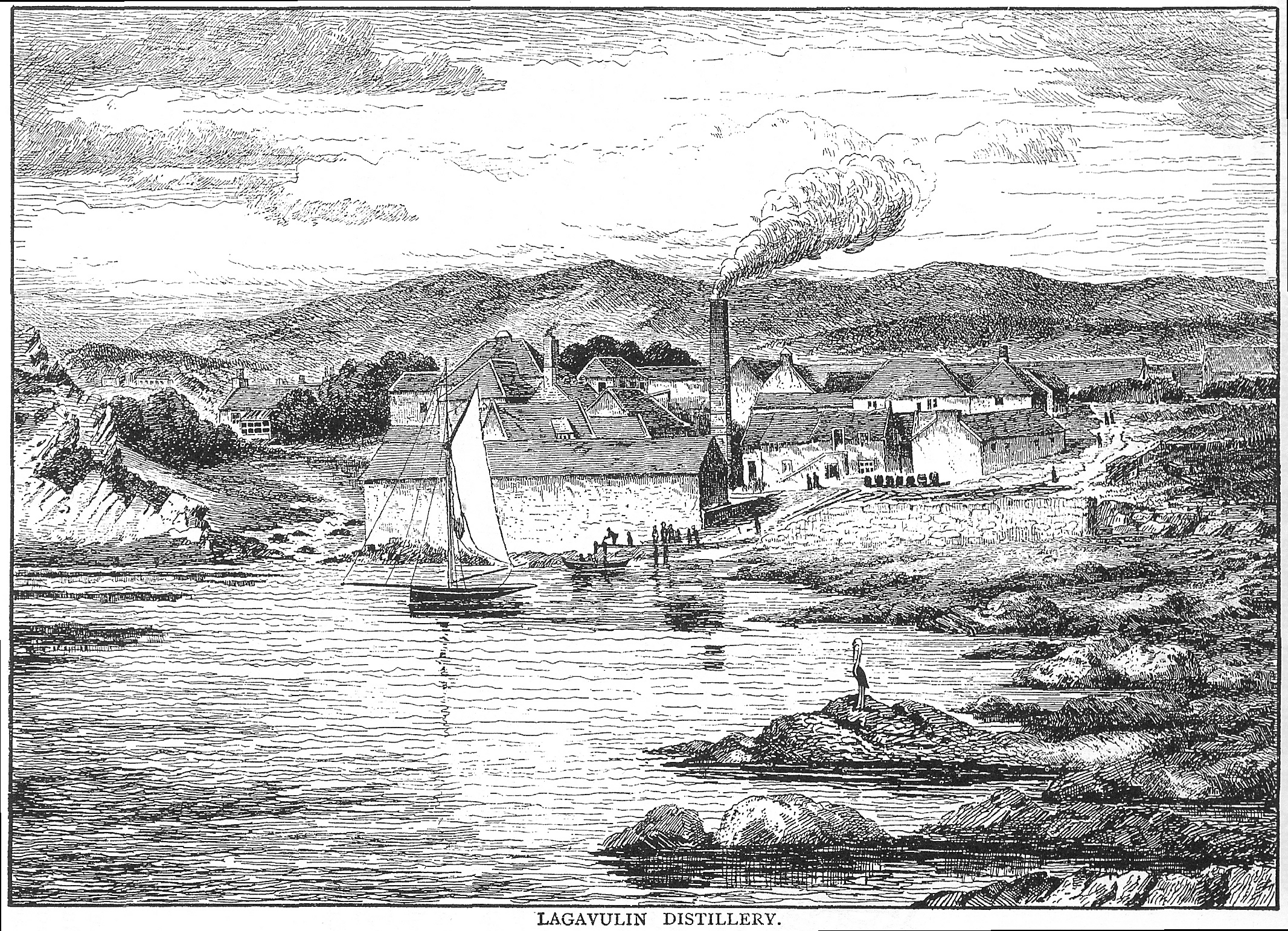
Bernard's drawing of the Lagavulin distillery.

The Whisky Distilleries does not go into specifics about the process of whisky making, as Barnard had no real technical knowledge of distilling, although it does list the equipment possessed and specification owned by each visited distillery. There are around 130 illustrations, and the text is approximately 250,000 words. Of the 161 distilleries featured in the book, 129 were in Scotland, with 120 of those producing single pot still whisky. The book begins with those Scottish distilleries in Glasgow, before traveling to visit the 28 distilleries in Ireland, followed by four of ten in England. Two of the 28 Irish distilleries produced single malt whisky, with the rest creating single pot still whisky. The six English distilleries that he named, but did not visit, are suspected to have produced industrial alcohol or gin.

Much of the book consists of Bernard's personal observations of the surrounding land and people. Also serving as a travel book, it details the hospitality of the places he stayed at during the visits, and his relationships with his hosts, who he frequently became friends with.

== Releases ==
The Whisky Distilleries was first published in 1887 by Harper's Weekly Gazette, a trade journal that now exists as Harpers Wine & Spirit.

A centenary edition of The Whiskey Distilleries was released by Mainstream Publishing and Lochar Publishing in 1987, with a foreword and introduction by David Daiches and Michael Moss.

== Legacy ==
Eleven years after the book was published, the total number of Scottish whisky distilleries had risen to 161. However, of the 129 Scottish distilleries featured in the book, around 30 had ceased operations by 1987.

In the decades after its release, The Whisky Distilleries began to be considered a collectors item, with individual copies reportedly selling for hundreds of pounds. One first-edition 1887 copy sold for £2,280 at auction in 2021.

In modern times, a spokesman for an Irish brewery referred to it as "the most respected reference on distillery history in Ireland", and it has been used as a reference point to back claims of being the "finest whiskey in the world".
