= Baron O'Brien =

Extinct barony in the Peerage of the United Kingdom

The title of Baron O'Brien has been created twice, once in the Peerage of Ireland and once in the Peerage of the United Kingdom.

== Baron O'Brien, of Burren in the County of Clare (1654) ==
The first creation was on 21 October 1654, when Murrough O'Brien, 6th Baron Inchiquin, was created Baron O'Brien and Earl of Inchiquin. The barony and earldom became extinct on the death of James O'Brien, 3rd Marquess of Thomond on 3 July 1855.

== Baron O'Brien, of Kilfenora in the County of Clare (1900) ==
The second creation was on 16 June 1900, when Sir Peter O'Brien was created Baron O'Brien. The title became extinct on his death on 7 September 1914.

== See also ==
- Baron O'Brien of Lothbury, life peerage created in 1973
