= Alfred Barnard =

British historian of alcohol (1837–1918)

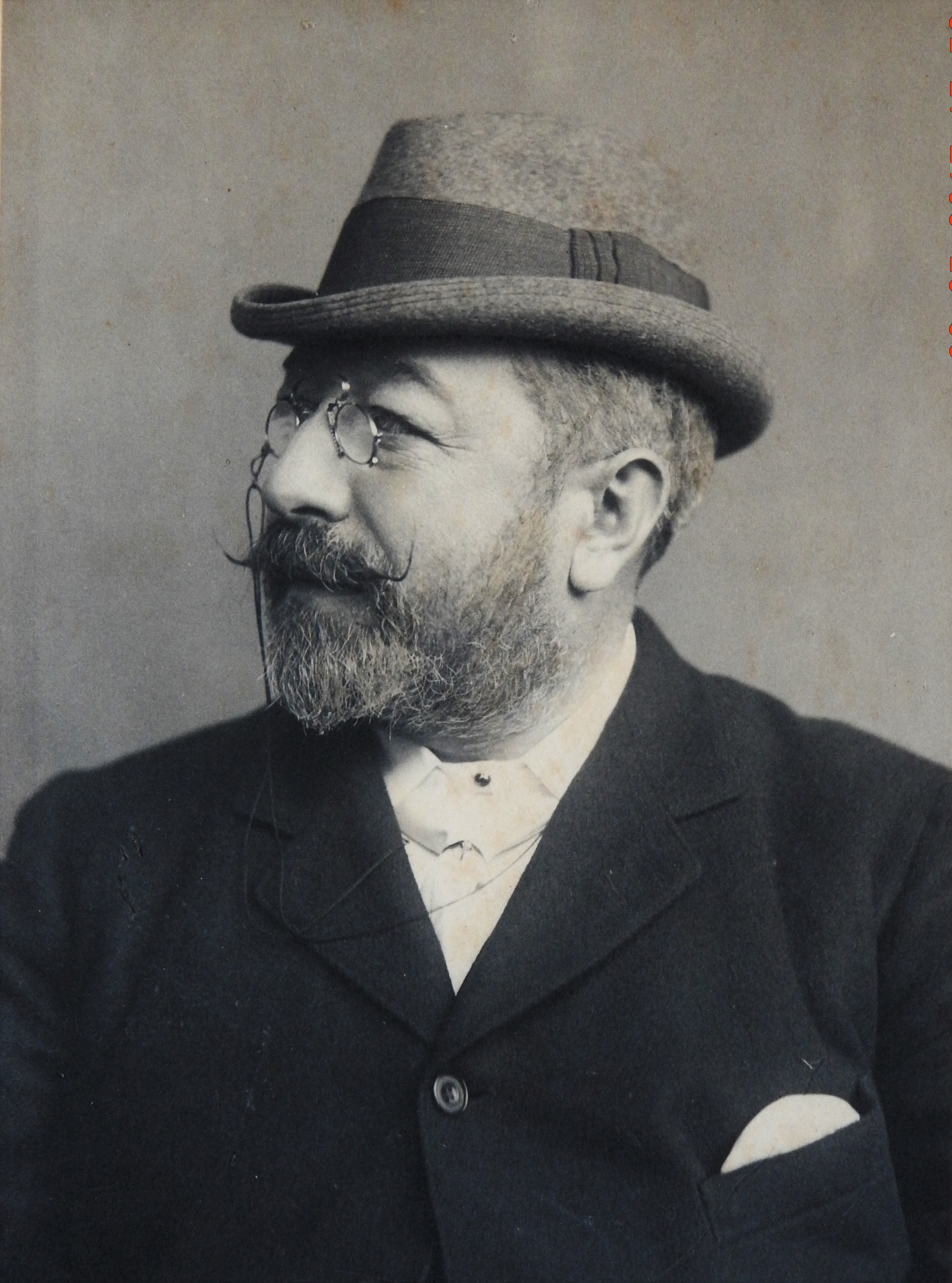
- Barnard's author photograph
- Born: 1837; Thaxted
- Died: 13 May 1918 (aged 81); Croydon
- Occupations: Writer and historian
- Notable work: The Whisky Distilleries of the United Kingdom

Alfred Barnard (8 May 1837 – 13 May 1918) was an English brewing and distilling historian.

== Life and work ==
Barnard was born on 8 May 1837 into a Baptist family in Thaxted, a rural village in Essex. He was one of eight children. His father was a draper and grocer.

In 1859, aged, 22 he married Fanny Ruffle, also 22. At this time, Alfred was a grocer residing in Kensington. They had two daughters, Theodora and Edith, and one son, Harold. Barnard was a toilet soap exporter, then a merchant and finally as a gentleman.

As secretary of Harper's Weekly Gazette, he visited every working whisky distillery in Great Britain and Ireland from 1885 to 1887. He visited 162 distilleries; 129 in Scotland, 29 in Ireland and 4 in England. The result of which was the 500 page The Whisky Distilleries of the United Kingdom, covering in depth technical information on the distilleries, along with sketches and engravings. Of the original print, only a small number of copies survive to this day, some are in presentation binding (leather) but most have a green cloth binding. Copies of the first edition have changed hands for £2,500. A facsimile copy was published in 1987, and has been reprinted three times since. The book has been referred to as "possibly the most important book written on whisky."

Following publication of Whisky Distilleries, he was commissioned by various distilling companies to produce promotional pamphlets. Six are known to still exist and are very rare. They are: How to blend Scotch Whisky for Mackie & Co, Pattison's/Glenfarclas, Johnnie Walker, Watson's of Dundee, the Highland Distillers and Dalmore distillery. He also wrote a thirty four page Pamphlet for Duncan, Alderdice & Co, Newry, Co. Down who had an extensive blending business. A copy is extant in the Newry Mourne and Down, Museum, Newry Co Down.

Following his first success, Barnard undertook a similar beer tour in 1889–1891, visiting over 110 breweries in Great Britain and Ireland. The end product of this tour was The noted breweries of Great Britain and Ireland, published over three years and in four volumes. They give a great description of the scale of industry at the time and also some biographies on some of the distinguished families involved, such as the Guinnesses. Promotional pamphlets were produced though unlike Barnard's whisky pamphlets, which were new and original works, these appear simply to be facsimile reprints of the relevant entry in the main volumes. The entries in Noted Breweries were far more extensive than those in his Distilleries volume.

He died in Croydon, South London on 31 May 1918, aged 81.

== See also ==
- Bitter
- Irish whiskey
- Irish stout
- Scotch whisky
- English whisky

== Bibliography ==
- Whisky Distilleries of the United Kingdom, 1887; reprinted Birlinn Ltd (1 Jul 2007); ISBN 1-84158-266-2
- The Noted Breweries of Great Britain and Ireland, 1891
- A Visit to Watson's Dundee Whisky Stores. 1891
- A Ramble Through Classic Canongate. 1892/3
- How to Blend Scotch Whisky, 1904; reprinted 2005
