= Tullamore Town Hall =

Municipal building in Tullamore, County Offaly, Ireland

- Halla an Bhaile Tulach Mhór
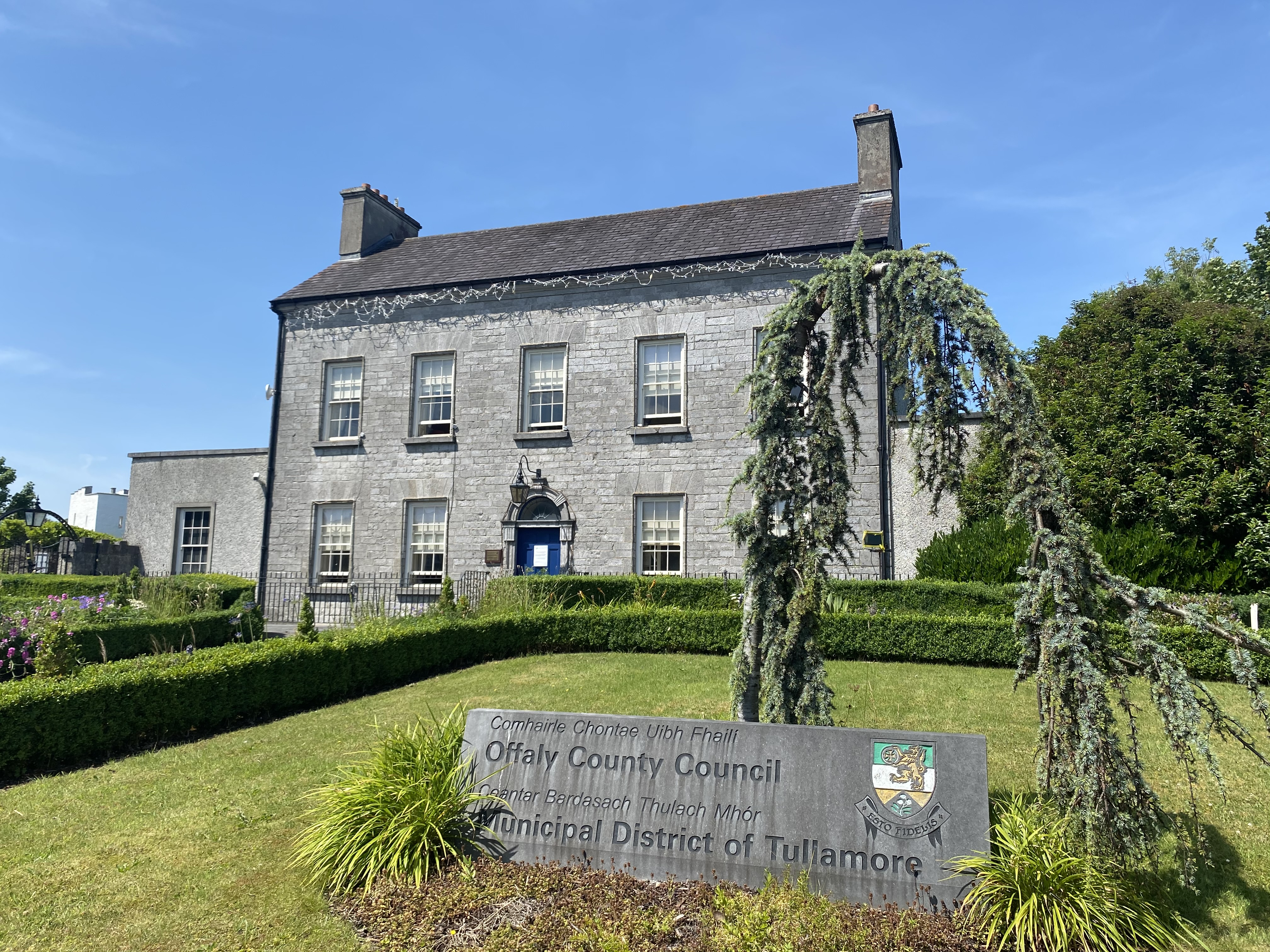
- Tullamore Town Hall

- Location within Ireland

General information
- Architectural style: Neoclassical style
- Location: Cormac Street, Tullamore, Ireland
- Coordinates: 53.2721°N 7.4951°W
- Completed: 1786

Tullamore Town Hall (Irish: Halla an Bhaile Tulach Mhór), is a municipal building in Cormac Street, Tullamore, County Offaly, Ireland. The building currently accommodates the local offices of Offaly County Council.

== History ==
The building was commissioned as a private residence by a local developer, Captain Thomas Acres, who also served as an officer in the Tullamore Yeomanry Corps. The site he selected, which was at the junction of the three principal roads in the town, was acquired from the lord of the manor, Charles Bury, 1st Earl of Charleville, whose seat was at Charleville Castle. The building was designed in the neoclassical style, built in coursed limestone and was completed in 1786. The design involved a symmetrical main frontage of five bays facing onto Cormac Street. The central bay contained a doorway with a fanlight, an architrave, and a lantern. The other bays on the ground floor and all the bays on the first floor were fenestrated by square-headed sash windows with window sills. There was a cornice and a pitched slate roof above.

Acres named his new house "Acres Hall" and went on to commission a folly, a two-storey tower with an under croft, in the garden of his house, to celebrate the British victory in the Peninsular War. After Acres died in 1836, the building passed down the Acres Family and, by marriage, down the Pierce family, until it was acquired by Patrick Eagan, the proprietor of P. & H. Egan, maltsters, in around 1890. It then passed down the Egan family until the 1980s.

Tullamore Urban District council, established under the Local Government (Ireland) Act 1898, in 1899, was based in an office in Tullamore Courthouse until 1974, when it relocated to a building in O'Connor Square which it shared with the County Library and the County Motor Tax Office. After finding this arrangement unsatisfactory, the urban district council acquired Acres House in the 1980s. The building was converted for municipal use at a cost of £450,000, and then re-opened by the Minister for Labour, Brian Cowen, as Tullamore Town Hall on 22 June 1992.

The building continued to be used as the offices of the urban district council until 2002, and then as the offices of the successor town council. In November 2013, Father Michael Kelly, who was known for his education work in relation to the HIV/AIDS epidemic in Zambia, attended the town hall to receive a civic award for his work. In 2014, the council was dissolved and administration of the town was amalgamated with Offaly County Council in accordance with the Local Government Reform Act 2014.
