= Tullamore Show =

Annual agricultural show

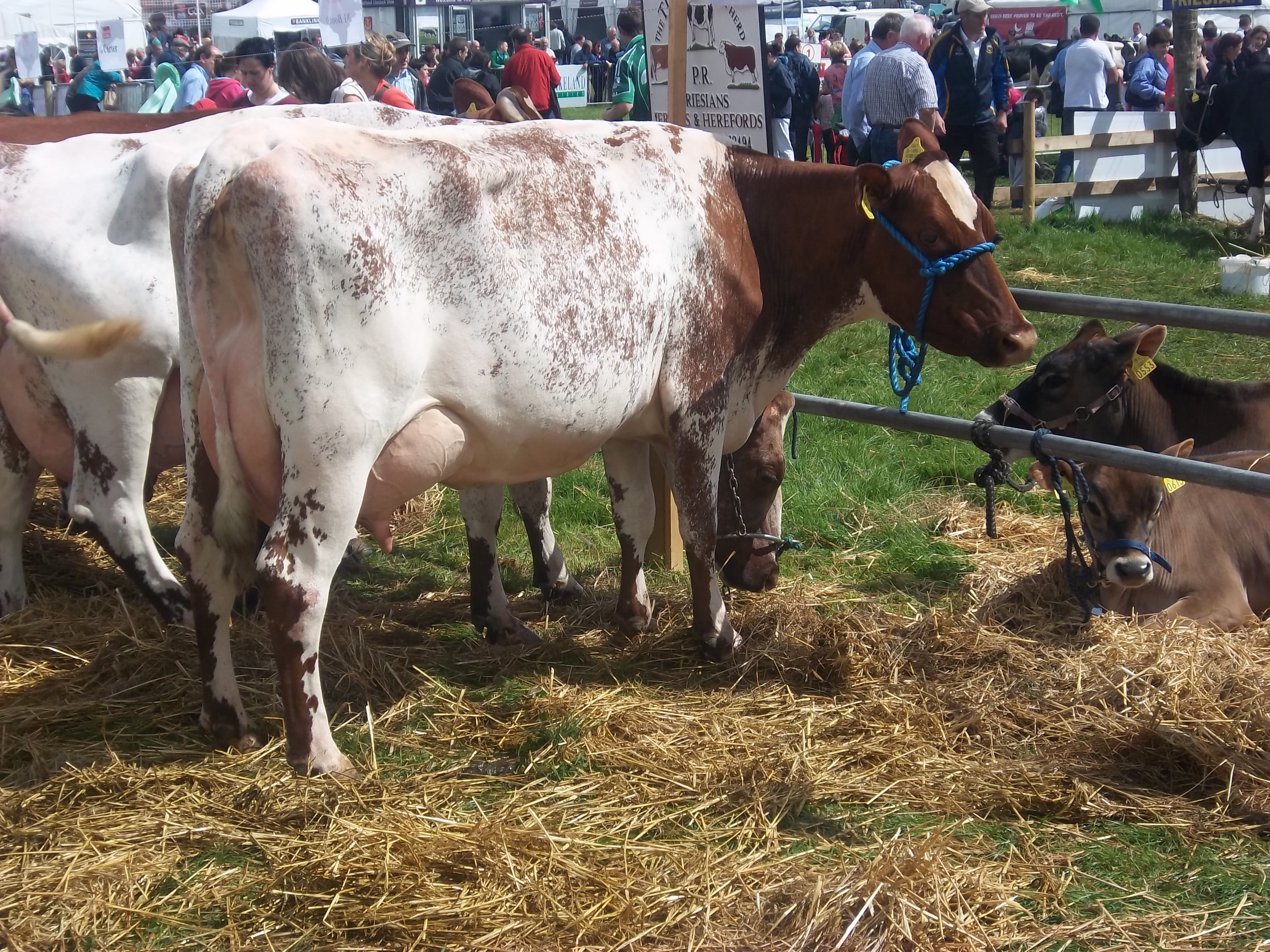
- Dairy Shorthorn cow at Tullamore Show
- Genre: Agricultural and livestock show
- Dates: Second Sunday in August
- Locations: Butterfield Estate, Tullamore, Offaly, Ireland
- Founded: 1840s (revived in 1990s)
- Attendance: 60,000 (2017)
- Website: www.tullamoreshow.com

The Tullamore Show is a one-day agricultural and livestock show held on the second Sunday of August each year near the town of Tullamore, County Offaly, Ireland. Its programme includes cultural events, commercial trade exhibitions, and competitive interests, including livestock, equestrian, home industries, inventions, vintage, fashion, style, cookery, crafts, and performing arts.

Agriculture was originally the show's main focus, but this has broadened to include entertainment, food, crafts, lifestyle including 700 trade stands, food and refreshments, fashion and entertainment. Described in some sources as "the biggest one-day event of its kind" in Ireland, the Tullamore Show has previously attracted 60,000 annual visitors.

== History ==
The first agricultural show in Tullamore took place in 1840. It lapsed in 1843, but was revamped and relaunched in the early 1900s. 1938 saw the last of this era of shows, until the idea was reignited in the early 1990s. The show was revived in 1991, 53 years since the previous show.

The first of the modern shows was held on the outskirts of Tullamore; the following year, it moved to the larger facility in the grounds of Charleville Castle. In its first 30 years, the modern show has been cancelled four times. The first cancellation was due to the outbreak of foot and mouth in 2001. The following cancellations were in the years 2007 and 2008, caused by torrential downfalls of rain just prior to opening of the show. In 2020 it was cancelled because of by the COVID-19 pandemic. The cancellations of 2007/2008 prompted another move to the Butterfield Estate at Blueball, 5 km from Tullamore where it has remained since. Attendances reached 40,000 in the 2000s, and 60,000 in the 2010s.
