= King Oak =

Famous tree in Ireland

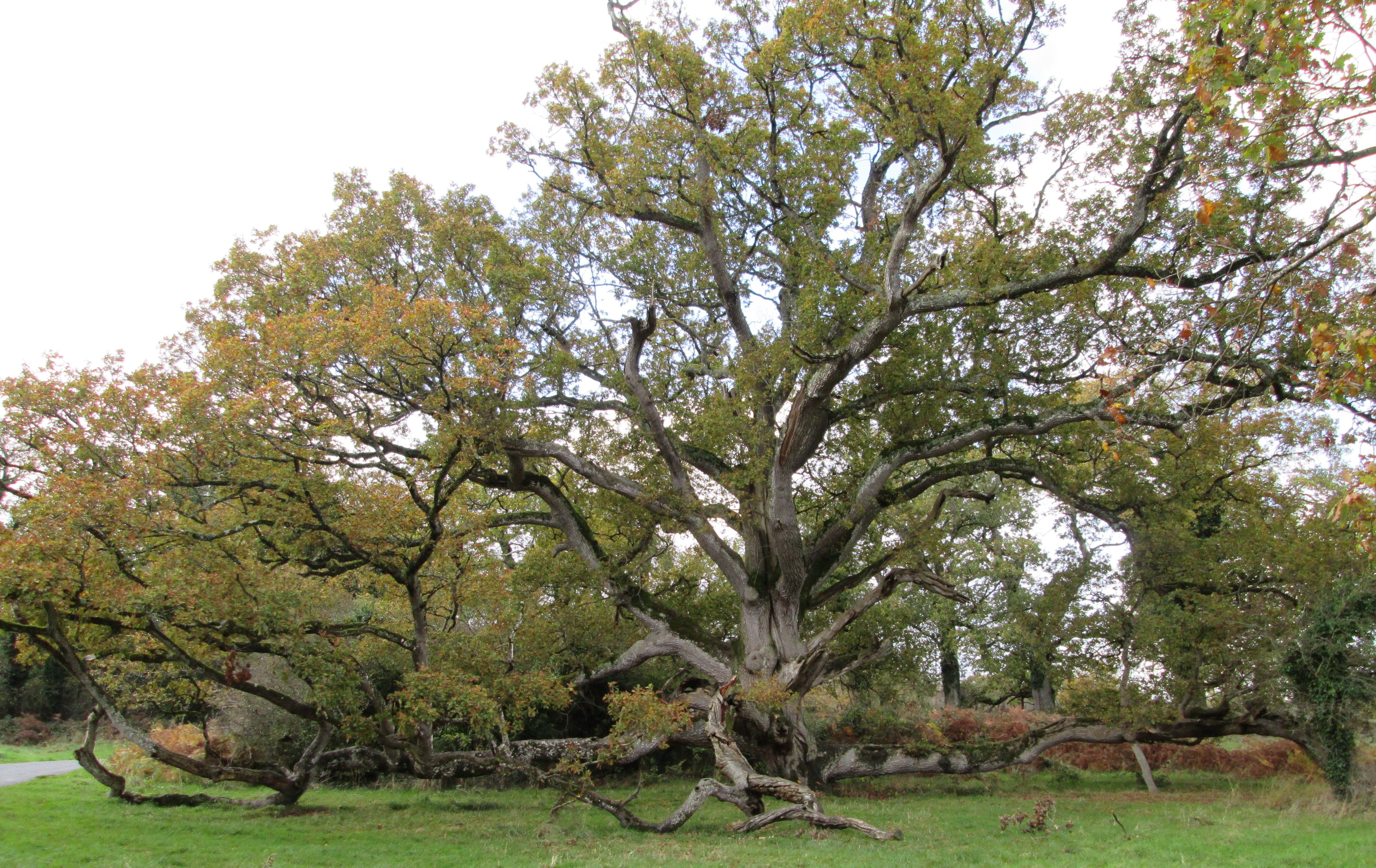
- Species: Pedunculate oak (Quercus robur)
- Location: Charleville Castle, Tullamore, Ireland
- Date seeded: 1200–1600
- Custodian: Charleville Estate

The King Oak is a tree in the grounds of Charleville Castle, Tullamore in Ireland. Descended from the ancient oak forests that were once commonplace in Ireland, the tree is estimated to be around 400 to 800 years old. The King Oak has been heavily pollarded and is a large tree, with a trunk of 8.29 metres (9.07 yd) girth and some of the lower branches extending as far as 27 metres (30 yd). A superstition associated with the tree says that if one of its branches should fall a member of Bury family, long-time owners of the Charleville Estate, will die. The 1963 death of Charles Howard-Bury has been held as confirmation of this belief, following shortly after the tree was struck by lightning which split its main trunk. The tree was nominated as the Irish entry for the 2013 European Tree of the Year contest, in which it finished third.

== Description ==
The King Oak is located in the grounds of Charleville Castle on the outskirts of Tullamore. It stands just inside the main entrance to the estate. The tree is a pedunculate oak (Quercus robur), also known as a common oak, European oak, or English oak. Its trunk is 8.29 metres (9.07 yd) in girth and the tree possesses an overall height of 19 metres (21 yd). The tree has large lower branches which spread for up to 27 metres (30 yd) from the main trunk and have been propped to prevent them from falling. The Charleville estate is home to one of the largest Pedunculate Oak forests in Ireland and is also home to a plot of yew trees in the shape of the Union Flag.

== History ==
The King Oak is at least 400 years old and possibly up to 800 years old, with it being mentioned as an old tree in 17th-century records. The Irish Wildlife Trust has described the King Oak as one of the oldest trees in the country. The tree is thought to be a descendant of the once widespread ancient oak forests of Ireland. The tree has been heavily pollarded for timber over its life.

The King Oak has been described as the star attraction of the Charleville estate. A superstition attached to the tree says that, if one of its branches were to fall, it will foretell the death of a member of the Bury family, the long-time owners of the Charleville estate. In 1963 the tree was struck by lightning, splitting the main trunk from top to bottom and causing the loss of at least one branch. The tree survived but Colonel Charles Howard-Bury, the explorer and last member of the Bury family line died a few weeks afterwards.

The King Oak was proposed by the Just Forests conservation charity as the Irish entry for the 2013 European Tree of the Year contest. The tree made it to the six-strong shortlist and in the final poll received almost six thousand votes, putting it in third place.

== See also ==
- Tree Council of Ireland
