= Blue Jean Country Queen Festival =

The Blue Jean County Queen is a festival run by Meath Macra na Feirme that has taken place over the June Bank Holiday weekend in Athboy, Co. Meath since 1987.

== History ==
In 1987, Patrick Farrelly a member of Macra na Feirme from Carnaross was inspired the song "Blue Jean Country Queen" by Linda Hargrove to create the festival. Since its inception, it has been run by Meath Macra na Feirme taken place in the town of Athboy, Co. Meath. Although in 2001 the festival was postponed due to the outbreak of foot and mouth disease.

The closure of The Old Darnley Lodge Hotel in 2013, which was the venue for much of the weekends activity, resulted in the festival organizers having to put together alternative arrangements for housing many of the events. The hotel re-opened under new management the festival returned there the following year.

The festival verged on moving to the nearby town of Navan in 2014. However a set of lucrative sponsorship offers from local businesses as well as Athboy Credit Union was enough to guarantee the festival remained in Athboy.

The 2020 Festival was due to be headlined by The Blizzards and Jake Carter. However, the event was cancelled due to the COVID-19 pandemic. The organizing committee chose to mark the June Bank Holiday weekend with "The Blue Jean Country Stream" a nostalgic look back at previous festivals featuring clips from through the festival's 30-year history was broadcast over social media.

In 2021, with the festival again postponed due to the on-going COVID-19 pandemic, Blue Jean Country Queen Aoife Scanlon embarked on a fundraising campaign in aid of the Irish Cancer Society.

The festival returned in June 2023, with Kilkenny's Niamh Sheehy claiming the title, becoming the first Kilkenny Blue Jean Country Queen.

== Contestants ==
The women who participate in the competition are either members of Macra na Feirme, or a similar rural youth organisation in the case of overseas contestants. There is also a contestant from the Autonne Villages in France whom Athboy are twinned with. Each contestant will have gone through an interview at their own county/regional level in order to be chosen to compete at the festival. Over the weekend the women are interviewed on stage by a celebrity and also by a panel of judges. Celebrity interviewers have included Ray D'Arcy, Brendan Grace, Darragh McCullough and Hector Ó hEochagáin.

== Events ==
The festival is made up of several events that run from the Friday before the June Bank Holiday to the Bank Holiday Monday itself. The events include:

=== Friday ===
The Queens arrive and are interviewed on stage. In 2023 the interviews were not held on Friday, instead, a music session was held in a local pub.

=== Saturday ===
Saturday has featured a street carnival, craft fairs, children's art competition, karaoke and live music. Since 2017, the festival's main sponsor Athboy Credit Union has held a BBQ and fun day in their car park on main street as part of the festival. The evening's events would begin with a Pub Crawl throughout the town led by the Queens and committee. In 2023, the pub crawl did not take place. Instead, the Queens' on-stage interviews were held on Saturday evening followed by live music.

=== Sunday ===
The Fair Green in Athboy plays host to family entertainment including music, entertainment, sideshows and the Queens engaging in a game of Fancy Dress Football. For many years the Queens were required to take part in a fashion show. This element of the festival was removed in 2023. That evening a banquet takes place in the Darnley Lodge Hotel, followed by live music and the announcement of the winning Queen at midnight.

=== Monday ===
A music session usually place in the Darnley Lodge Hotel along with lunch for committee, Queens and their host families.

== Previous Winners ==
Year	Winner	Represented
1987	Samantha Baldwin	Wicklow
1988	Valerie Huxley	Limerick
1989	Martina Mongey	Meath
1990	Stephanie O'Grady	Limerick
1991	Martina Daly	Cork
1992	Ailish Murphy	Laois
1993	Audry Margret Moran	Cork
1994	Rosemary Holmes	Mayo
1995	Brid O'Reily	New York
1996	Mary B. Miller	Laois
1997	Helena Fagan	Westmeath
1998	Pauline Byrne	Kildare
1999	Denise Cormican	Galway
2000	Pamela Leonard	Mayo
2001	N/A	N/A
2002	Gillian Porter	Donegal
2003	Carol Byrne	Waterford
2004	Edel Toolan	Sligo
2005	Jean Williams	Galway
2006	Deirdre Maloney	Clare
2007	Haily Clarke	England
2008	Catriona O'Connor	Seandun, Cork
2009	Jillian McKay	Scotland
2010	Celine Smyth	Meath
2011	Petrice Dineen O'Leary	Seandun, Cork
2012	Leanne Brennan	Wexford
2013	Canelle Beuze	France
2014	Kate Manning	Limerick
2015	Susie Manson	Scotland
2016	Dearbhla O'Connor	Louth
2017	Alison Sinnott	Wexford
2018	Alison O'Connor	Kerry
2019	Aoife Scanlon	Meath
2020	N/A	N/A
2021	N/A	N/A
2022	N/A	N/A
2023	Niamh Sheehy	Kilkenny
2024	Alannah Finnegan	Cavan
2025	Amy Coffey	Waterford

== See also ==
- Macra na Feirme
- Queen of the Land Festival
