= Tullamore =

Town in County Offaly, Ireland

Tullamore Tulach Mhór (Irish)
- Town
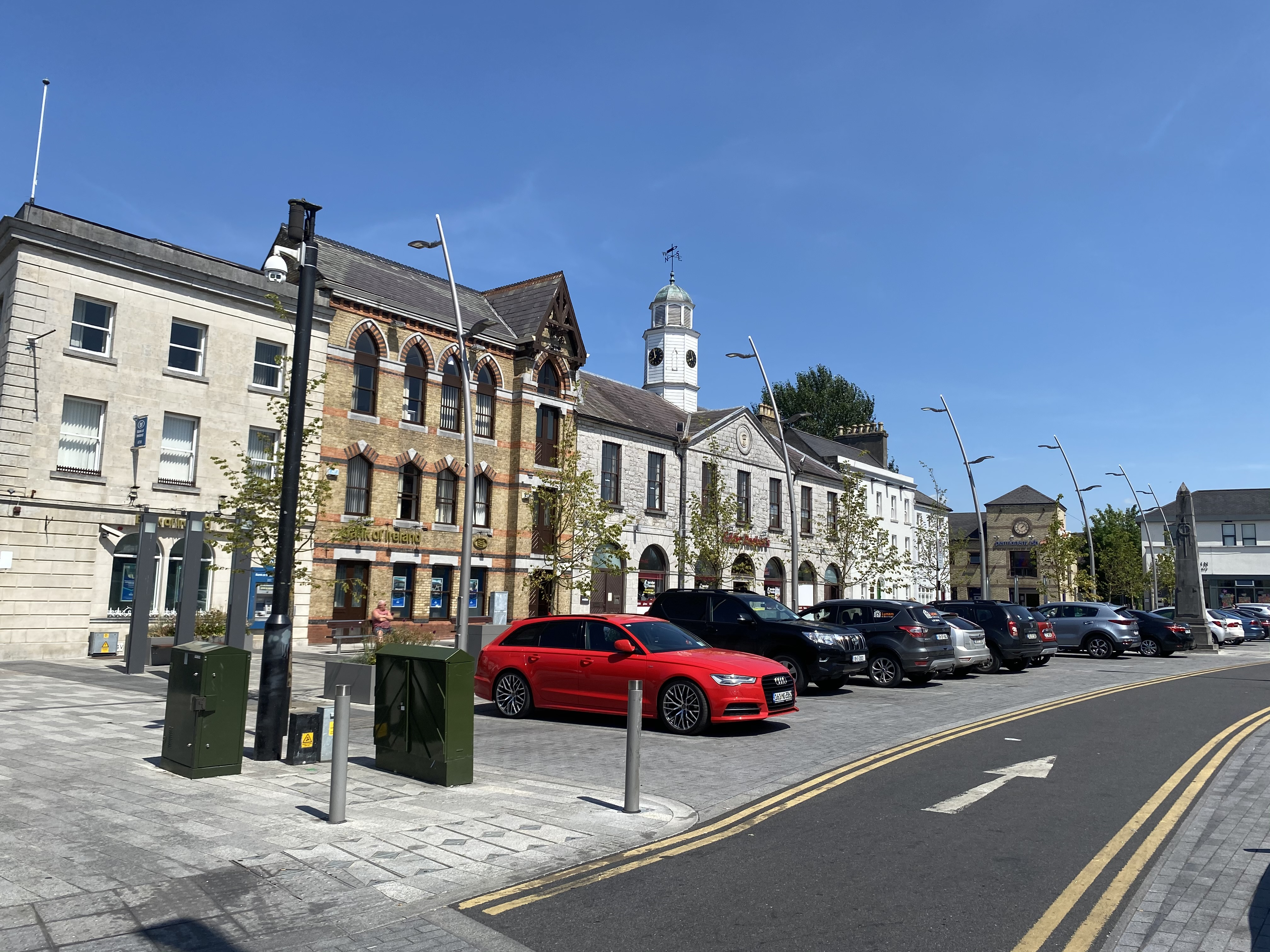
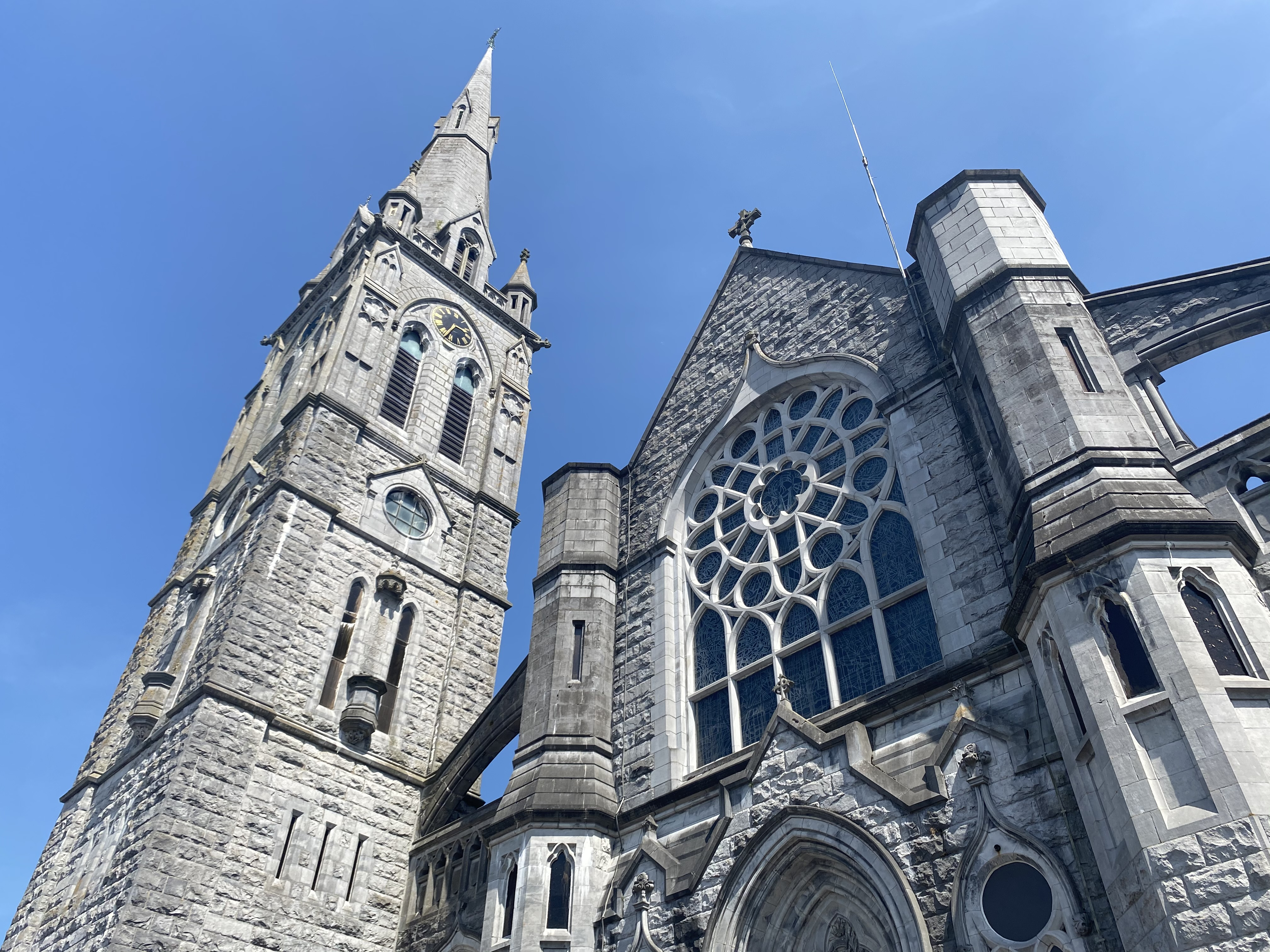
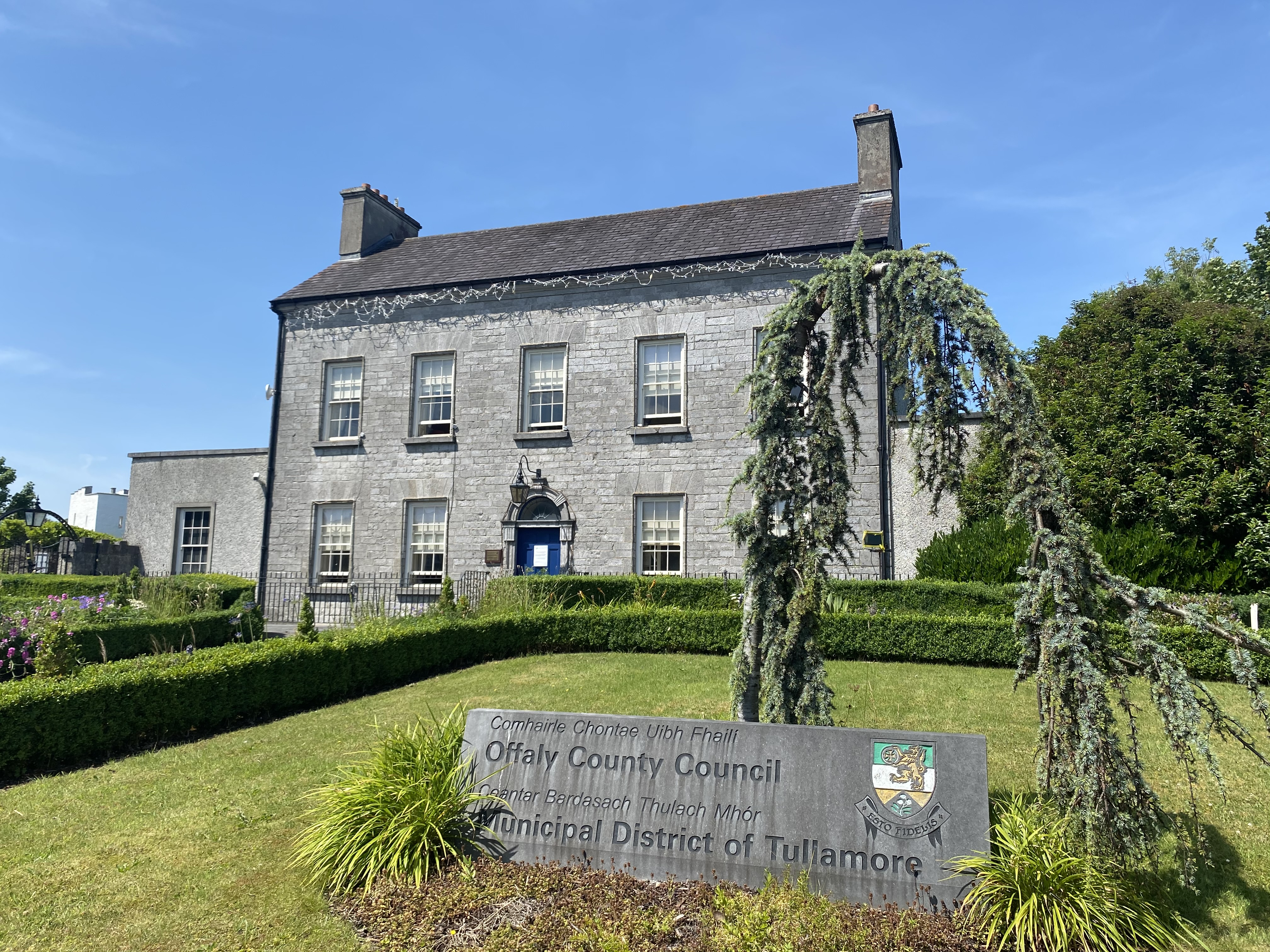
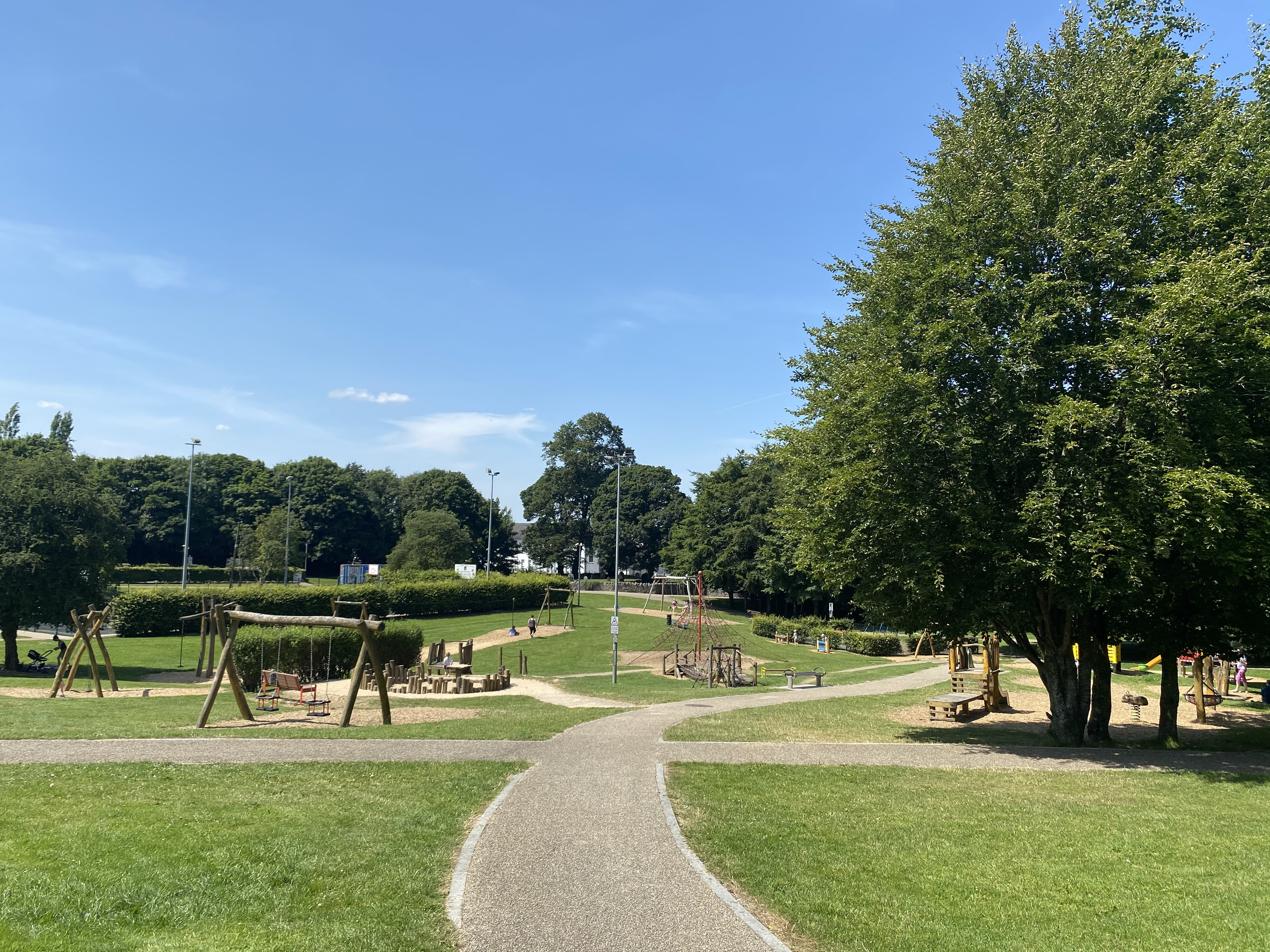
- O'Connor Square Church of the Assumption Tullamore Town Hall Town park

- Flag Coat of arms

- Location in Ireland
- Coordinates: 53.2667°N 7.5000°W
- Country: Ireland
- Province: Leinster
- County: Offaly
- Elevation: 73 m (240 ft)

Population (2022)
  - Total: 15,598
- Time zone: UTC±0 (WET)
  - Summer (DST): UTC+1 (IST)
- Eircode routing key: R35
- Telephone area code: +353(0)57
- Irish Grid Reference: N335248

Tullamore (/ˈtʊləˌmɔːr/; Irish: Tulach Mhór, meaning 'great mound') is the county town of County Offaly in Ireland. It is on the Grand Canal, in the middle of the county, and is the fourth most populous town in the Midlands Region, with 15,598 inhabitants at the 2022 census.

The town's most famous export is Tullamore Dew – an Irish whiskey distilled by Tullamore Distillery – that can be traced back to 1829. The original distillery was shut down in 1954. The brand was later resurrected, but at first was produced at the Midleton Distillery in County Cork. However, in 2014, the brand's new owners, William Grant & Sons, invested in a new distillery near Tullamore, bringing whiskey production back to the town.

The Tullamore Show is held near the town each year. In 2026, Tullamore retained gold medal status in the Tidy Towns. The town hosted the World Sheepdog trials in 2005, which attracted international interest in the region.

== History ==
Historical population
Year	Pop.	±%
1821	5,407	—
1831	6,342	+17.3%
1841	6,343	+0.0%
1851	4,630	−27.0%
1861	4,797	+3.6%
1871	5,179	+8.0%
1881	5,098	−1.6%
1891	4,522	−11.3%
1901	4,639	+2.6%
1911	4,926	+6.2%
1926	4,930	+0.1%
1936	5,135	+4.2%
1946	5,897	+14.8%
1951	6,165	+4.5%
1956	6,147	−0.3%
1961	6,243	+1.6%
1966	6,874	+10.1%
1971	7,474	+8.7%
1981	8,724	+16.7%
1986	9,442	+8.2%
1991	9,430	−0.1%
1996	10,039	+6.5%
2002	11,098	+10.5%
2006	12,927	+16.5%
2011	14,361	+11.1%
2016	14,607	+1.7%
2022	15,598	+6.8%

In the Middle Ages, Tullamore was within the Gaelic territory of Firceall ruled by the O'Molloy clan. Firceall was part of the Kingdom of Meath. The Tullamore area was part of the first English plantations in Ireland during the 1550s when land was confiscated from the native Irish and colonized with English settlers. Firceall was divided into the baronies of Ballycowan, Ballyboy and Eglish, with Tullamore located in Ballycowan.

The Tullamore area, comprising some 2,000 hectares (5,000 acres), was granted by the English to Sir John Moore in 1622. At that time the Tullamore estate included a ruined castle, ten cottages and two water mills. Sir Robert Forth, who leased the lands from Thomas Moore (son and heir of Sir John), built a mansion house c.1641 in what is now the Charleville demesne. Charles Moore, Lord Tullamore, grandson of Thomas, eventually regained possession of the estate and when he died in 1674 it went via his sister to Charles William Bury. Charles William was later (1806) created the 1st Earl of Charleville in a second creation of the title.

On 10 May 1785, the town was seriously damaged when the crash of a hot air balloon resulted in a fire that burned down as many as 130 homes, giving the town the distinction of being the location of the world's first known aviation disaster. To this day, the town shield depicts a phoenix rising from the ashes. The event was commemorated by the Tullamore Phoenix Festival, which celebrated the town's resurrection from the ashes following the accident.

The Grand Canal linked Tullamore to Dublin in 1798. In 1806, during the Napoleonic Wars, a clash between troops of the King's German Legion and a regiment of Irish militiamen who were both stationed in the town, became known as the Battle of Tullamore. Tullamore became county town of County Offaly in 1835, replacing Daingean.

Tullamore has a long history of whiskey distilling, with two distilleries known to have operated in the town in the 1780s, though closed some years later. Subsequently, a new distillery was established by Michael Molloy, on the site of one of the old distilleries in 1829. When Molloy died, the distillery first passed to his brother Anthony, before eventually making its way into the hands of his nephew, Bernard Daly. When Daly died, his son, Captain Bernard Daly took ownership of the business. With an estate in Terenure, Captain Daly left the day-to-day running of the business to Daniel E. Williams, the distillery's general manager, under whose careful watch the distillery grew and prospered, and launched Tullamore Dew, the whiskey which bears his initials. Williams brought electricity to Tullamore in 1893. The distillery installed the town's first telephones and introduced motorised transport. Williams ran various commercial businesses throughout the Irish midlands – drinks businesses, tea importing, seed and grain retail, and a network of 26 general stores.

Following this period, Prohibition in the United States, an economic war with Britain in the 1930s, and World War II all harmed the industry. Tullamore was one of many Irish distilleries affected by a general decline in Irish whiskey sales worldwide. After World War II, Desmond Williams, grandson of Daniel E. Williams, used modern marketing techniques to re-establish Irish whiskey in world markets. In 1947, Desmond Williams also developed Irish Mist, an Irish liqueur made from a blend of whiskey, herbs and honey, using a recipe alleged to have disappeared in the late 17th century and to have been rediscovered in a manuscript 250 years later. Williams also capitalised on the Irish coffee concept, and promoted blended whiskeys along with Tullamore Dew.

== Culture ==
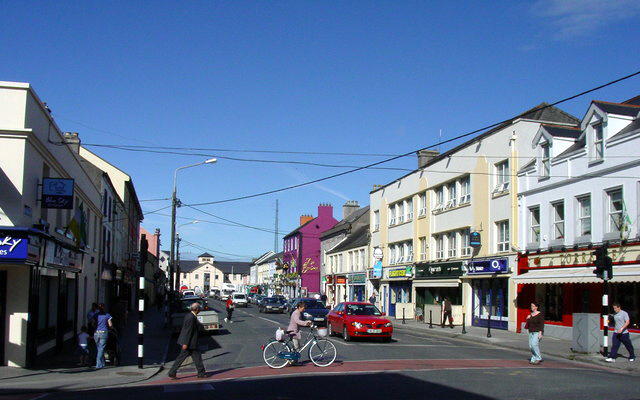
Patrick Street, Tullamore

The Tullamore Phoenix Festival was a celebration of art, culture and heritage first held in August 2001. Festival events included hot air balloons, concerts, street entertainment, a parade, and fireworks. The festival was held annually until 2011, when it was announced that year's event would be cancelled in response to an insurance dispute with Tullamore Town Council.

Tullamore has hosted the Queen of the Land Festival, an annual three-day festival organised by Macra na Feirme that takes place during the second weekend in November. Founded in 1964, the event brings contestants together from across Ireland who compete for the title of "Queen of the Land" based on their "personality, energy, confidence, rural knowledge and eloquence." The festival was suspended in 2020 and 2021 due to the COVID-19 pandemic, and resumed in 2022. However, the 2024 edition of the festival was cancelled, with Marca na Feirme citing "circumstances outside of the control of the festival committee" as the reason.

An annual Tullamore Show takes place on the second Sunday of August every year. It was cancelled in 2007 and 2008 due to heavy rain, though it ran again in 2009. Agriculture was originally the show's main focus, but this has broadened to include entertainment, food, crafts, lifestyle, trade stands, food and refreshments, fashion and entertainment.

Hugh Lynch's Pub on Kilbride Street has been operating as a public house since the early 1800s. In the early 1900s it was bought by the Williams Group, founders of the D.E. Williams Distillery, and run as a public bar and grocery, along with many other outlets in the Irish Midlands, from which they sold their growing whiskey brand "Tullamore Dew". It has been in the Lynch Family since 1971.

The national Fleadh Cheoil was held in Tullamore for the very first time in August 2007. It returned in 2008 and returned for the third time from 21 to 23 August 2009.

The National Ploughing Championships were held in Screggan, Tullamore in 2016. The total attendance figures for the 2016 Championship came to a record-breaking 283,000. The show returned to Screggan in September 2017.

Tullamore has won 11 consecutive gold medal awards in the Tidy Towns competition between 2015 and 2025, and this success streak continued in 2026.

== Places of interest ==
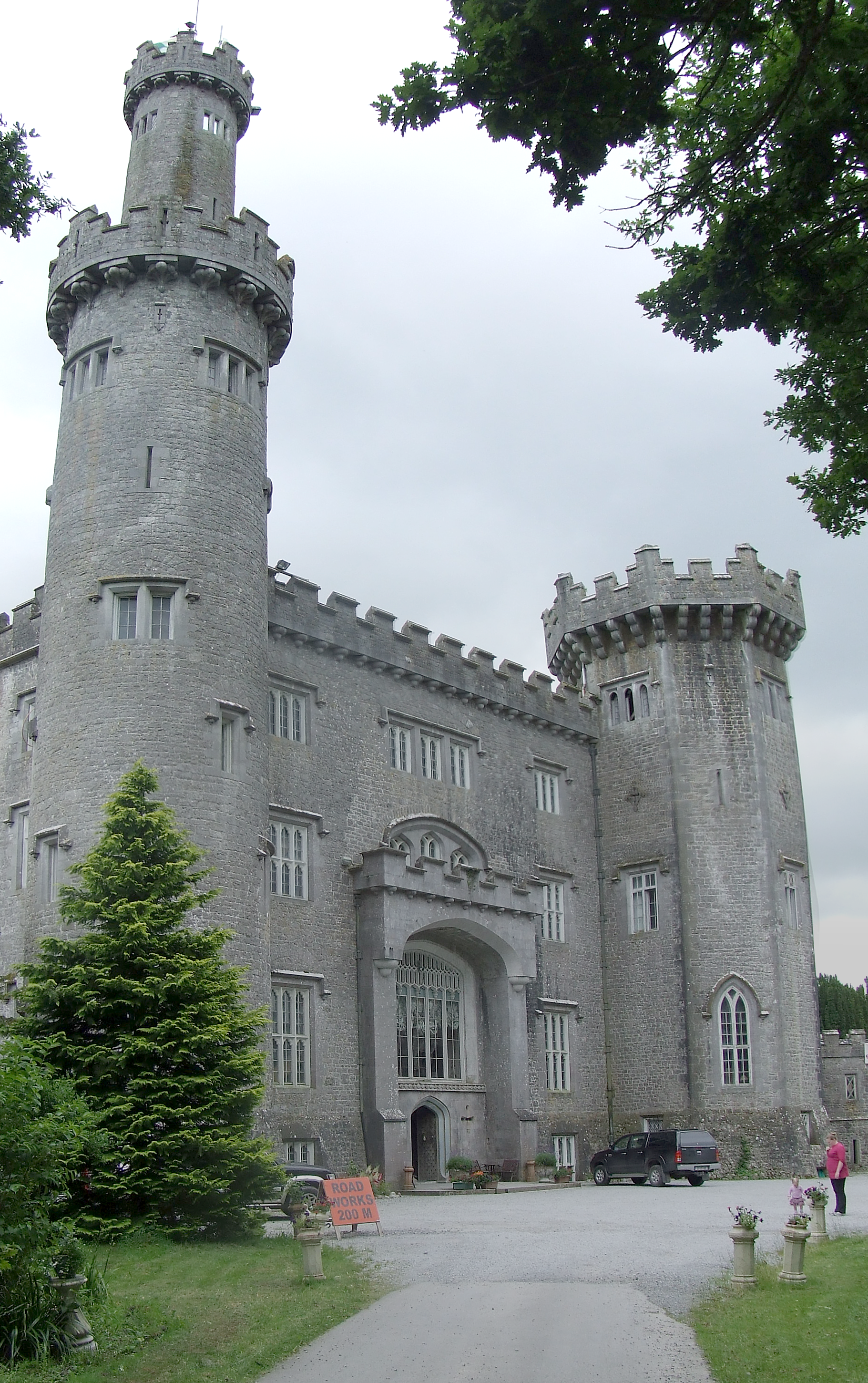
Charleville Castle

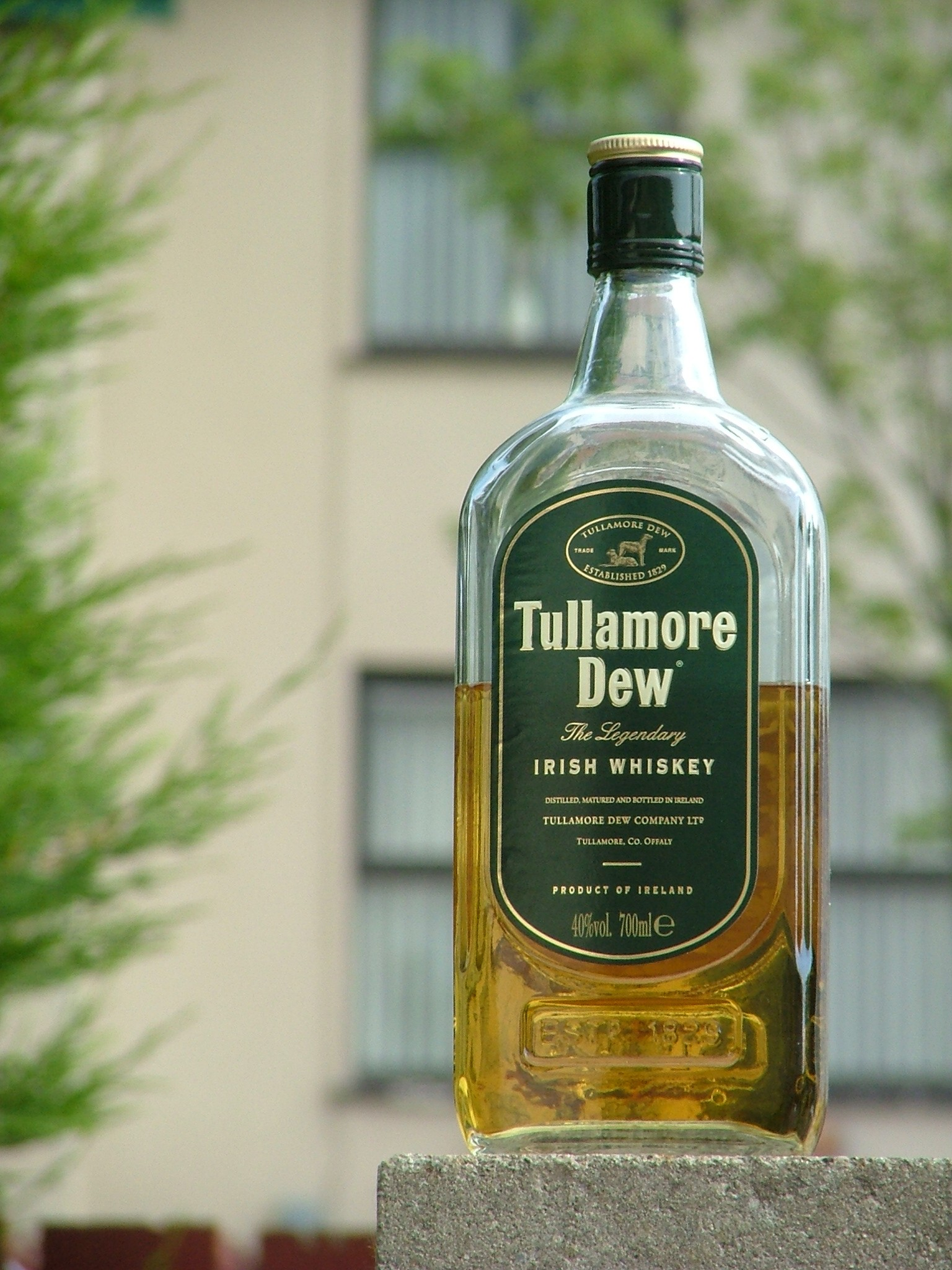
Tullamore Dew

The Tullamore Dew Visitor Centre on the banks of the Grand Canal focuses on the distilling, canal and urban history of the town. Audio visual and self-guided tours are available.

Charleville Estate is located on the edge of the town. The Gothic Charleville Castle stands in this parkland setting which contains the King Oak, a 19-foot tall oak tree estimated to be 400 to 800 years old. The castle is said to be haunted and has been featured on several reality television series including Most Haunted, Scariest Places on Earth and Ghost Hunters International. The park was the location of the annual Tullamore Agricultural Show. However, following the cancellation of the show for two consecutive years due to heavy rainfall the event was moved to a new location with improved drainage in the Blue Ball area, south of the town.

Tullamore is used as a base for the Slieve Bloom Mountains to the south of the county.

Also south of Tullamore are the Lough Boora parklands. These boglands contain a range of flora and fauna. The wetlands also contain a number of large-scale environmental sculptures that form part of the 'Sculpture in the Parklands' sculpture park.

10 km west of Tullamore is the village of Rahan. The remains of what was once a large monastery settlement founded by St.Carthage or Mochuda in the 6th century, can be seen in the village.

Within 5 minutes drive is the Celtic cross of Durrow. In the late 6th century, Durrow Abbey was founded here by Saint Columba. The monastery is known for the Book of Durrow, an illuminated manuscript probably written here around 700. Nearby is the 7th-century Tihilly Church and High Cross. Little remains of the stone church, but the high cross has visible patterns of beasts as well as panels of Adam and Eve and the crucifixion.

There are four metal sculptures collectively known as the Saints and Scholars located on the N52 Tullamore bypass on the esker ridges that roadway cuts through. Maurice Harron created the figures presenting symbols of learning and sanctity. The figures were funded under the percentage for arts scheme where 1% of the budget was allocated to roadside art.

There are also a number of churches in the town, including Tullamore Catholic Church of the Assumption, Tullamore Presbyterian Church, and St. Catherine's Church of Ireland.

Tullamore Town Hall, which dates from 1786, used to be a private house known as Acres Hall.

== Economy ==
As the county town of Offaly, many government services are located here such as the headquarters of Offaly County Council, the Midlands Regional Hospital and HSE services. Government departments located in the town include the Department of Agriculture, Food and the Marine and the Department of Education.

Tullamore has traditionally been an important industrial, retail and services centre for County Offaly. When the Grand Canal opened in the late 18th century, it offered increased connectivity to the town and offered an increased market for goods produced in the area. Tullamore Dew, a brand of Irish Whiskey was first distilled in the town in 1829. Tullamore was connected to the national railway network in 1854 by the Great Southern and Western Railway company, now Iarnród Éireann. Tullamore is also located near the boglands of the Bog of Allen. This provided employment through the work of Bord na Mona. Agriculture is also important to the local economy.

There are a number of industrial estates in the town, and multinational employers in the area include Sennheiser, Covidien and Zannini.

=== Retail ===
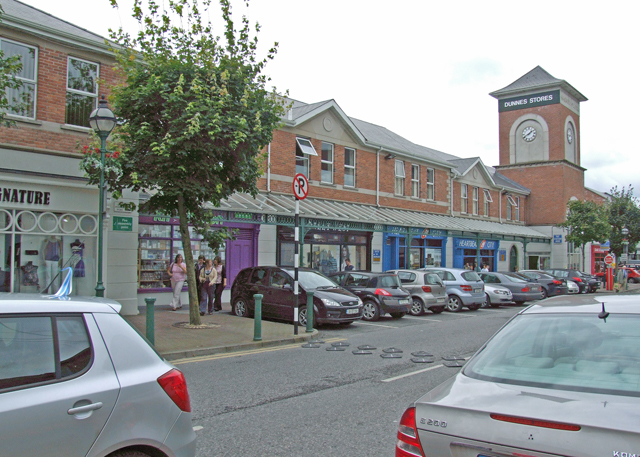
The Bridge Centre, a shopping area in central Tullamore, opened in 1995

The Bridge Centre, one of the main shopping areas in the town centre, was officially opened on 12 September 1995. It has outlets of Dunnes Stores, Vero Moda, and Holland and Barrett. The Tullamore Retail Park on the Portarlington Road also has a mix of shops including Tesco, DID Electrical, Sports Direct and Woodie's. Boots opened in the town during the 2010s.

== Media ==
The Tullamore transmitter was a medium wave radio mast commissioned at Tullamore in 1975. Transmissions of RTÉ Radio 1 were broadcast until its closure in 2008. The transmitter was subsequently demolished in 2023.

Tullamore is the headquarters of the regional radio station Midlands 103, and is serviced by the station on 95.7 FM. The town's local newspapers include The Tullamore Tribune and The Offaly Independent.

Tullamore features as a setting in the book Far From Home (2006) by the author Lyn Andrews.

== Demographics ==
The population of Tullamore (and its environs) rose from 10,029 in 1996, to 15,598 in 2022, an increase of over 55%.

== Transport and access ==
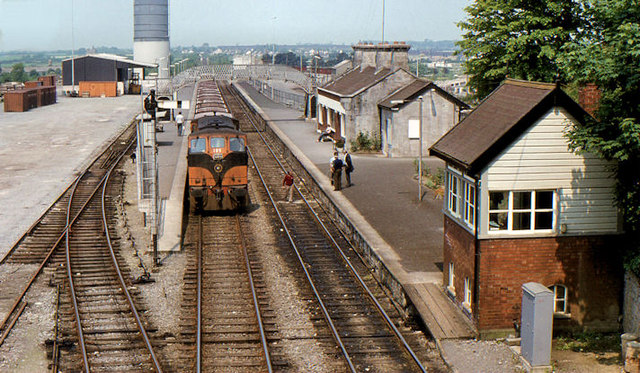
Tullamore railway station 1982

Tullamore railway station, first opened on 2 October 1854, is served by trains on the Dublin-Galway and Dublin-Westport/Ballina inter-city routes.

In association with the County Westmeath urban centres, Athlone and Mullingar, Tullamore forms part of what is known as the Midlands Gateway.

Tullamore lies on the N52 national secondary road. This connects to Birr in the southwest of the county and continues towards Mullingar which is located to the northeast. At Kilbeggan (about 12 km north of Tullamore) the N52 forms an interchange with the M6 motorway which connects Dublin and Galway. The N80 national secondary road connects Tullamore with Killeigh, Mountmellick and Portlaoise, travelling in a southwards direction. A number of regional roads run through the town such as the R420 connecting Tullamore to Moate, Clara and Portarlington, and the R421 which connects to Kinnitty.

=== N52 Tullamore Bypass ===
In March 2008, construction of the N52 Tullamore bypass commenced, re-routing the N52 away from the town centre. The bypass is a 14 km (8.7 mi) single carriageway which leaves the previous N52 approximately 6 km (3.7 mi) southwest of Tullamore at the townland of Heath, before rejoining the original N52 3 km (1.9 mi) north of the town at townland of Gormagh. The bypass was officially opened in late 2009 by then Taoiseach Brian Cowen.

== Sport ==
Tullamore has a number of sporting organisations, including Gaelic games, association football, rugby union and athletics clubs.

Gaelic games are represented by Tullamore GAA, Ballinamere GAA and Durrow GAA. Tullamore GAA have won thirty-two senior football championship titles as of 2026. The club has also won ten senior hurling championship titles, while its most recent victory in 2009 was also its first title since 1964. Ballinamere GAA won the intermediate hurling championship in 2013, and was the 2026 runner-up in the senior hurling championship. Durrow GAA won the senior 'B' football championship in 2020. O'Connor Park in Tullamore is the Offaly GAA home stadium for the Offaly Gaelic football and Offaly county hurling team. The stadium has a capacity of 18,000 following an upgrade in 2006.

Association football (soccer) is represented by Tullamore Town F.C. This club was founded in 1941 and have teams in the Leinster Senior League, Combined Counties League (2nd team Women's and Youths) and the Midland Schoolboys League.

Tullamore Rugby Club was founded in 1937 and is based in Spollenstown. The club has won the Provincial Towns Cup on five occasions, and has claimed the All-Ireland Junior Cup three times. The club competes in the All-Ireland League and has produced international players including Jordan Conroy, Megan Burns, and Cormac Izuchukwu.

Tullamore Harriers caters for athletics in the town, and was founded in 1953.

Other leisure facilities include the Aura Leisure Centre Tullamore, located on Hophill Road, which has a full gym suite and a 25-metre swimming pool. Tullamore Golf Club has been situated at Brookfield since 1926 and has an 18-hole championship parkland golf course. It was rated among the top 25 parkland courses in Ireland in Backspin's 2014 Irish Golf Course Rankings. Tullamore was also the venue of the 2005 World Sheepdog Trials; 241 dogs and their handlers from 21 countries including the United States, Australia and New Zealand competed in the event.

== Education ==
Tullamore has several primary schools including Charleville National School, Gaelscoil an Eiscir Riada, and Tullamore Educate Together National School. There are three secondary schools in the town; Tullamore College, a coeducational, multidenominational vocational school, the Sacred Heart School, a Catholic all-girls school, and Coláiste Choilm, a Catholic all-boys school.

== Notable people ==
Notable current and former residents of Tullamore include:

- Conor Brady, former editor of The Irish Times
- Pat Burke, the first Irish-born player to play basketball in the NBA.
- Yvonne Farrell (born 1951), architect
- Gerald Gardner (1922–2009), geophysicist and social activist whose statistical analysis led to the banning of classified advertising segregated by gender in a 1973 ruling by the US Supreme Court
- Michael Kelly (1929–2021), Jesuit missionary active in the fight against AIDS in Zambia
- Alfie Lambe (1932–1959), missionary and founder of Legion of Mary in South America
- Dónal Lunny (born 1947), traditional Irish musician and performer
- Susan Moran (born 1980), basketball player, originally from Kilbeggan in County Westmeath, who lived in Tullamore before moving to the US
- James Nolan (born 1977), middle-distance athlete, silver medallist at the 2000 European Indoor Championships
- Sinéad O'Dwyer (born 1991), fashion designer
- Sister Genevieve O'Farrell (1923–2001), Irish educator and college principal
- Tom Scully (1930–2020), priest and manager of the county football team

== International relations ==
=== Twin towns ===
Tullamore is twinned with Chandler, Arizona in the United States.

== Gallery ==
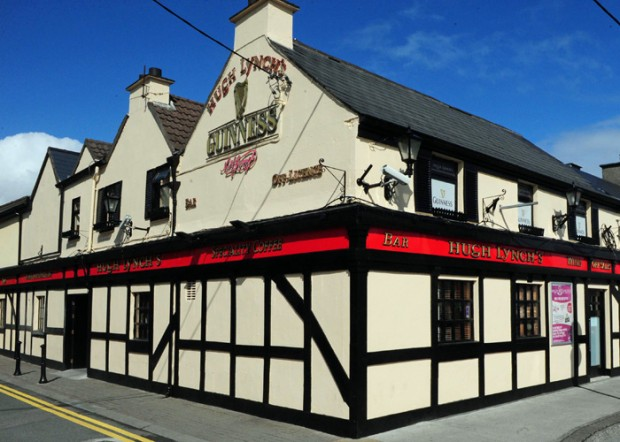
Hugh Lynchs Pub

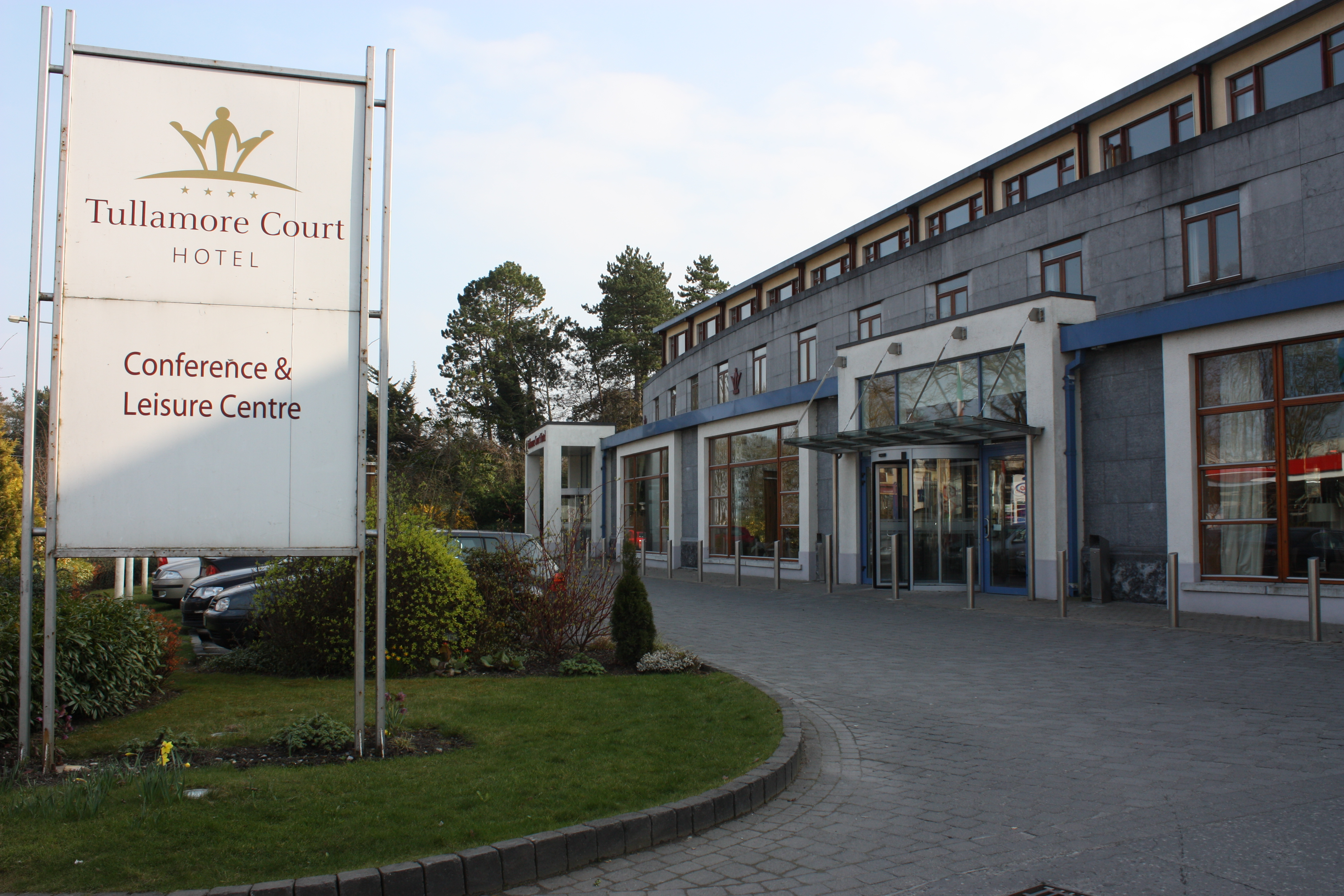
Tullamore Court Hotel

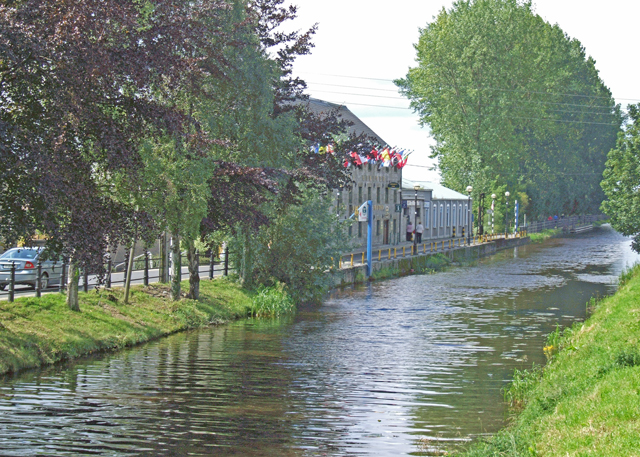
Grand Canal

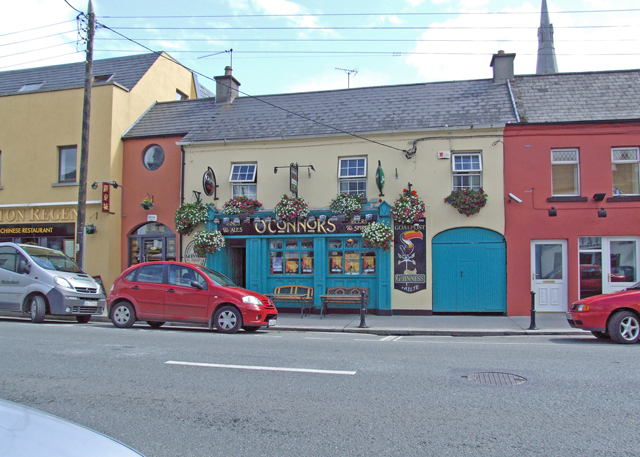
Columcille Street

== See also ==
- List of towns and villages in Ireland
- Market Houses in Ireland
