= Blue Ball, County Offaly =

Village in County Offaly, Ireland

Blue Ball An Phailís
- Village
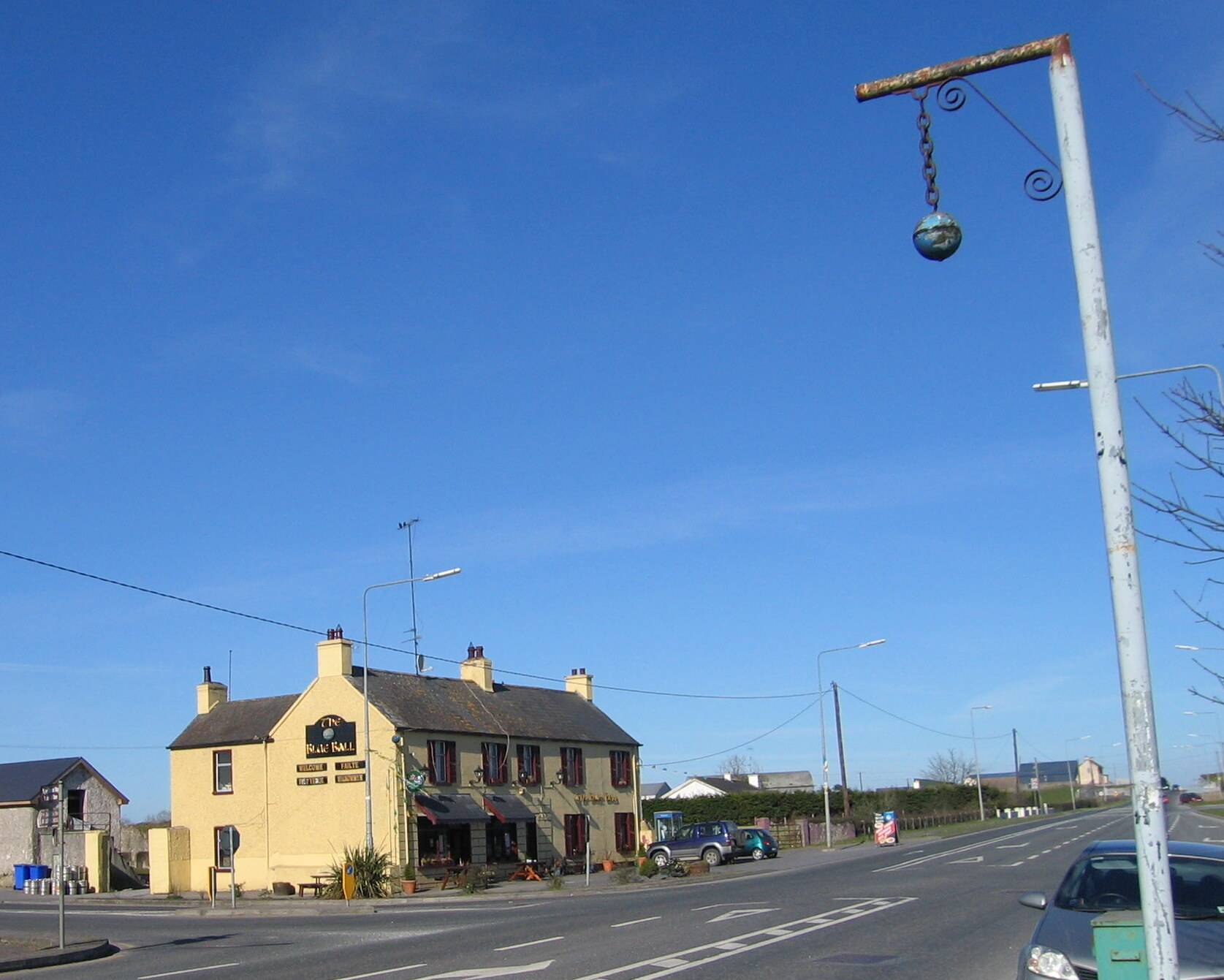
- The Blue Ball pub and signage at Blue Ball, County Offaly

- Location in Ireland
- Coordinates: 53°13′N 7°37′W
- Country: Ireland
- Province: Leinster
- County: Offaly
- Time zone: UTC+0 (WET)
  - Summer (DST): UTC-1 (IST (WEST))

Blue Ball, historically known as Pallas (Irish: An Phailís), is a small village in County Offaly, Ireland. It is 9 km southwest of Tullamore, at the junction of the N52 and the R357 roads, in the civil parish of Killoughy.

The village's modern English language name derives from the Blue Ball Pub, which is located within Pallas townland. Pallas Lough, also within the civil parish of Killoughy, is a small fishing lake located to the east of the village.

Butterfield Estate, near Blue Ball, hosts an annual agricultural and livestock show, the Tullamore Show.

== See also ==
- List of towns and villages in Ireland
