= Tullamore Dew =

Brand of Irish whiskey

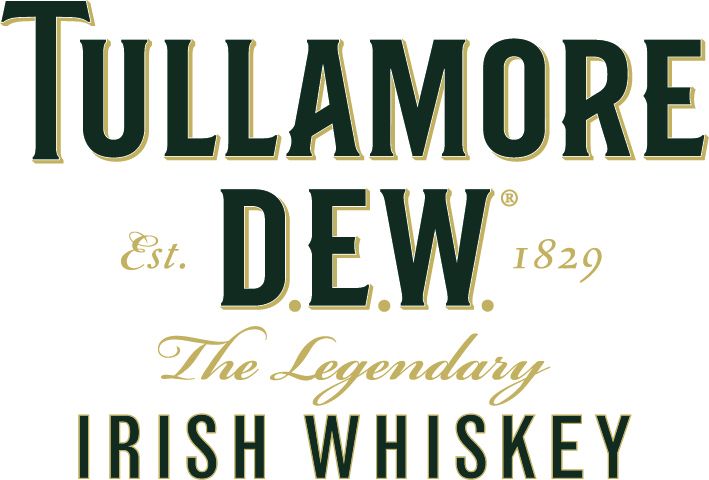
- Type: Irish whiskey
- Manufacturer: William Grant & Sons
- Origin: Tullamore, Ireland
- Introduced: 1829
- Alcohol by volume: 40%
- Website: www.tullamoredew.com

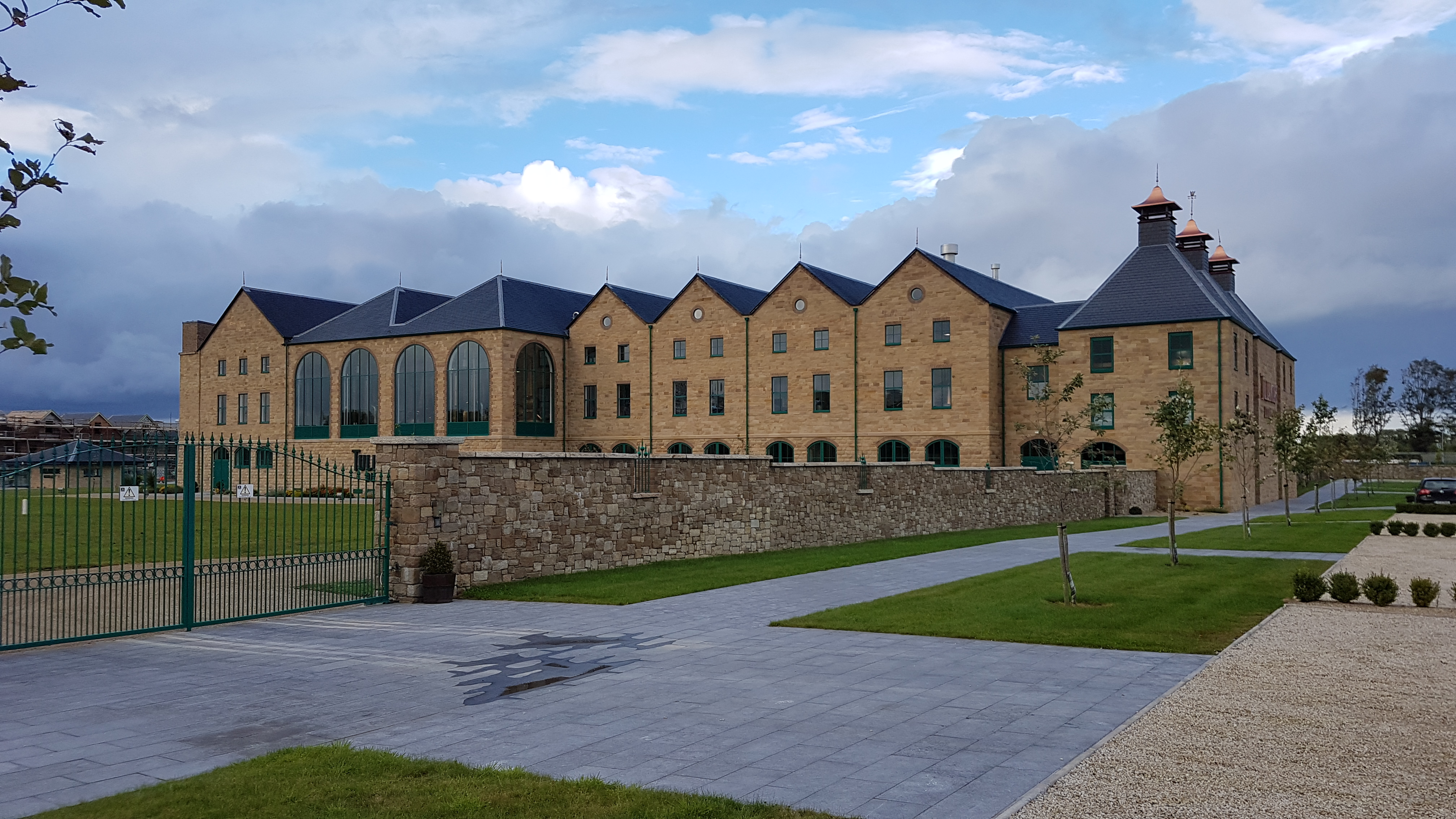
Tullamore distillery

Tullamore Dew, rendered in most branding as Tullamore D.E.W. (typically with the dots de-emphasised using colour and font size), is a brand of Irish whiskey produced by William Grant & Sons. It is the second-largest-selling brand of Irish whiskey globally, with sales of over 1,500,000 cases per annum as of 2020.

The whiskey was originally produced in Tullamore, County Offaly, Ireland, at the old Tullamore Distillery which was established in 1829. Its name is derived from the initials of the brand's creator, Daniel Edmund Williams (1848–1921), a general manager and later owner of the original distillery. In 1954, the original distillery closed down, and with stocks of whiskey running low, the brand was sold to John Powers & Son, another Irish distiller in the 1960s, with production transferred to the Midleton Distillery, County Cork in the 1970s following a merger of three major Irish distillers.

In 2010, the brand was purchased by William Grant & Sons, who constructed a new distillery on the outskirts of Tullamore. The new distillery opened in 2014, bringing production of the whiskey back to the town after a break of sixty years.

In 2012, a visitor centre was opened in a refurbished bonded warehouse previously belonging to the original distillery. The centre offers guided tours and tutored tastings ranging from 50 minutes to 5 hours in duration.

== History ==
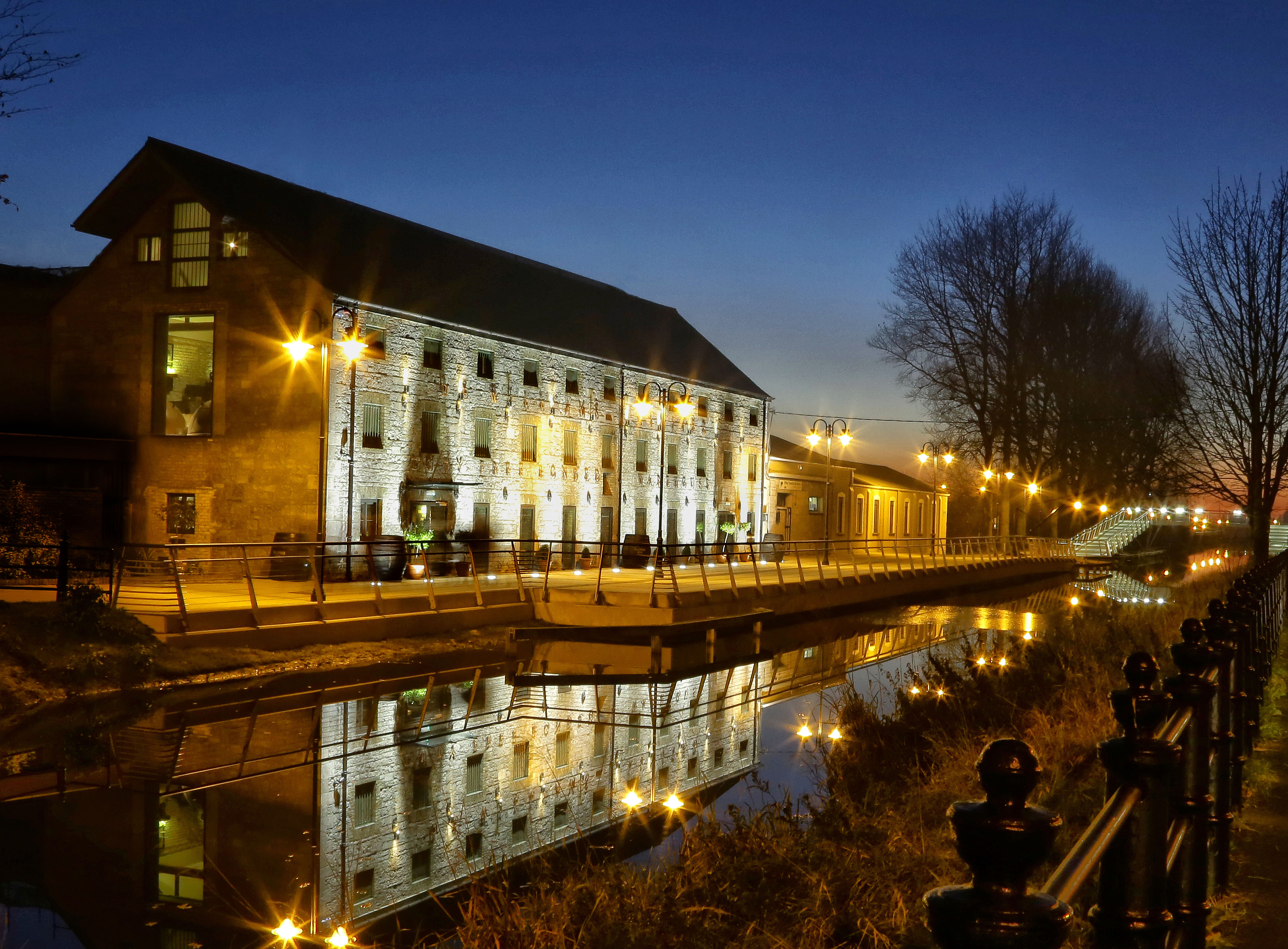
The Tullamore D.E.W. Visitor Centre at Bury Quay, Tullamore is housed in a former bonded warehouse belonging to the original distillery.

The beginning of Tullamore D.E.W. dates back to 1829, when a distillery was established in Tullamore by Michael Molloy. Upon his death, the ownership passed to his nephew, Bernard Daly who later appointed Daniel E. Williams as the distillery's General Manager. The distillery was originally named Daly's Whiskey and sold mainly to the U.K. and Australia.

Daniel E. Williams played a significant role in expanding the distillery and modernizing the town. In 1893, he was instrumental in introducing electricity to Tullamore and installing its first telephone line. Outside of whiskey production, Williams also imported tea, seeds, and various grains. Under Williams's leadership, the distillery grew significantly, and after his death, the business remained in the family, which rebranded the whiskey to include his initials, D.E.W.

In 1954, the distillery ceased production, having, like many of those in Ireland at the time, been hit by declining sales due to a number of factors such as Prohibition, the Anglo-Irish Trade War and high taxes introduced by the Irish Free State.

In the 1960s, with whiskey stocks running low, rather than reopen the distillery, the owners opted to sell the brand to John Powers & Son, the Dublin distillers. In 1966, John Powers & Son merged with two other Irish distilleries to form Irish Distillers. In the 1970s, Irish Distillers closed their existing distilleries and consolidated production at a new distillery built in Midleton, County Cork.

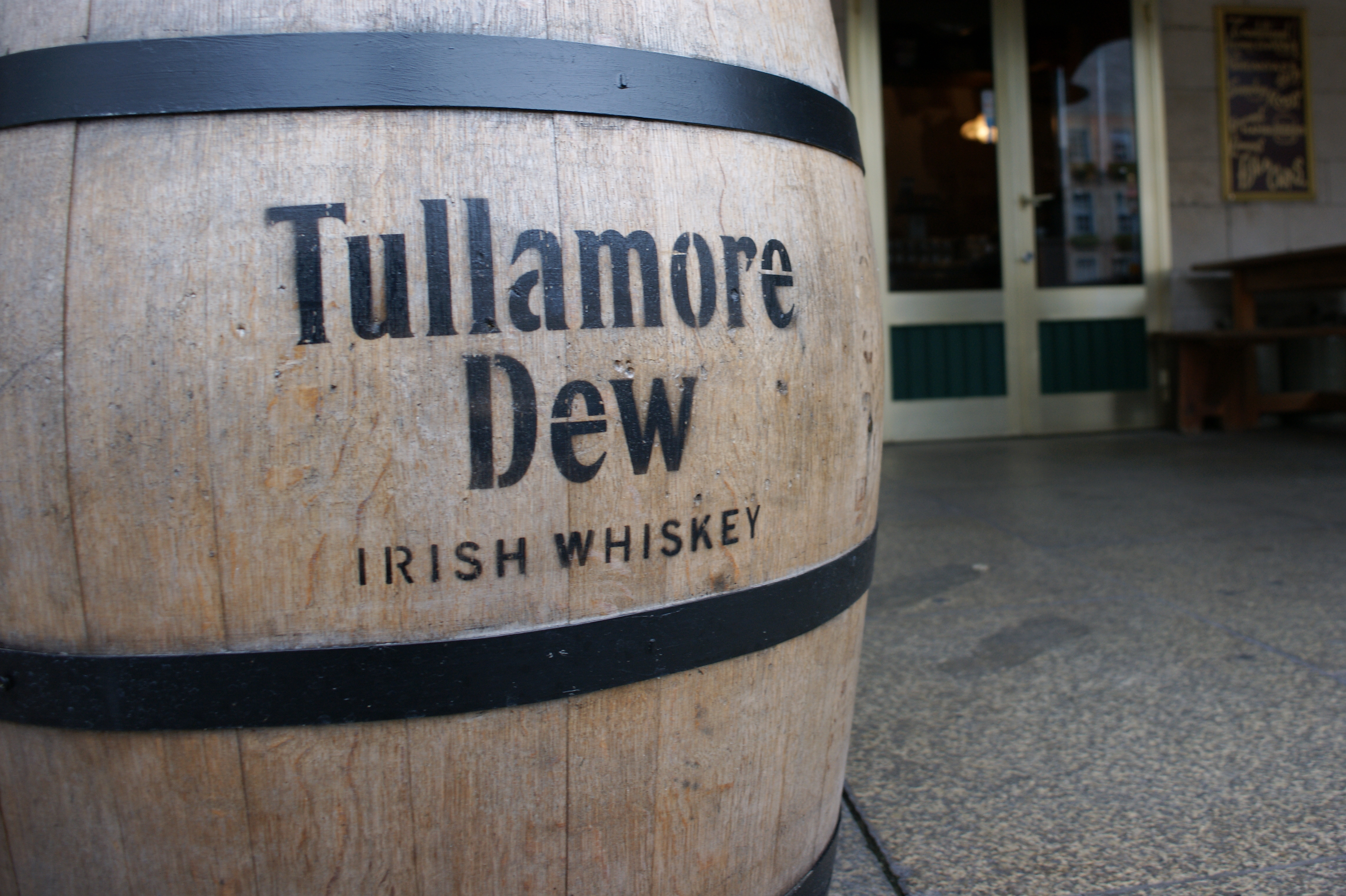
A cask bearing the "Tullamore Dew" brand

In 1994, Irish Distillers, then concentrating their international focus on promoting Jameson Irish whiskey, sold the brand to the C&C Group. Subsequently, the C&C Group divested their entire liqueur and spirit business (including Tullamore D.E.W.), which was acquired by William Grant & Sons for €300 million in 2010. At which point, Tullamore D.E.W. was still being produced under license at the Midleton Distillery. Therefore, as expansion of the brand was dependent on the availability of whiskey from Midleton, and with significant growth envisaged, William Grant & Sons opted to construct a new distillery in Tullamore, rather than depend on outsourced production.

Construction of the distillery is to take place on a phased basis. Phase one was completed in 2014, which saw production of whiskey return to Tullamore for the first time in sixty years. The new distillery has the capability to produce both malt and pot still whiskey. However, it does not yet have a Coffey still installed to allow the production of grain whiskey. Therefore, as Tullamore D.E.W. is a blend of all three varieties of Irish whiskey, the grain whiskey component of the blend will continue to be sourced from Midleton until phase two is completed.

As of 2015, the whiskey sells about 950,000 cases per year (an amount that has doubled since 2005).

In March 2024, Tullamore D.E.W. launched a new brand look designed to improve grip on the bottles and reduce carbon emissions.

== Variants ==
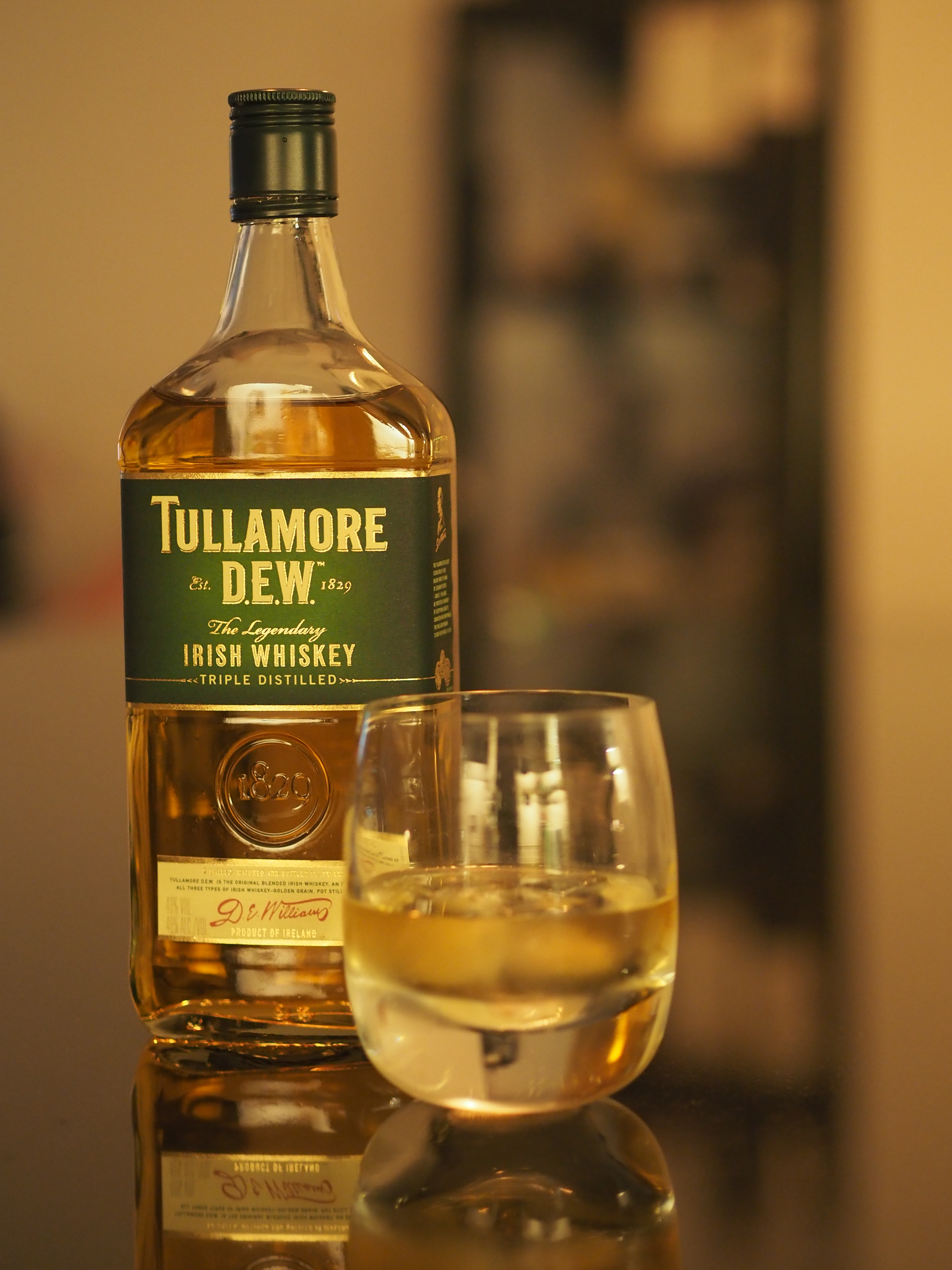
Tullamore D.E.W. Original

As of 2023 a range of seven whiskeys are sold under the Tullamore D.E.W. brand:

- Tullamore D.E.W. Original Irish Whiskey (40% ABV, 80 Proof); a blend of triple-distilled pot still and malt, plus grain whiskey; matured in ex-bourbon and sherry casks
- Tullamore D.E.W. 12 Year Old Special Reserve (40% ABV, 80 Proof): blend with a high pot still and malt content; aged for 12–15 years in ex-bourbon and sherry casks
- Tullamore D.E.W. 14 Year Old Single Malt (41.3% ABV, 82.6 Proof): triple distilled, finished in bourbon, port, Madeira, and Oloroso sherry casks
- Tullamore D.E.W. 18 Year Old Single Malt (41.3% ABV, 82.6 Proof): matured 18 years in ex-bourbon casks, and finished in ex-Oloroso sherry butts, ex-port pipes and ex-Madeira drums
- Tullamore D.E.W. Old Bonded Warehouse Release (46% ABV, 92 Proof): released in 2012 to celebrate the opening of a visitor centre in an old bonded warehouse (hence the name), it is only available in the visitor center; aged in Oloroso casks
- Tullamore D.E.W. Cider Cask Finish (40% ABV, 80 Proof): finished in cider casks; was released in June 2015 for sale through airport retail outlets. It is claimed to be the first ever cider cask–finished Irish whiskey. Tullamore D.E.W. whiskey is finished for three months in barrels that have stored pressed fermenting apples for several months.
- Tullamore D.E.W. XO Caribbean Rum Cask Finish (43% ABV, 86 Proof):Original triple distilled triple blend of pot still, malt and grain Irish whiskey finished in first fill XO rum casks previously used to age Demerara rum to impart their distinctive tropical fruit and warm spice flavors.

Past releases include:

- Tullamore D.E.W. 10 Year Old Single Malt (40% ABV, 80 Proof): single malt matured in ex-bourbon, Oloroso, Port and Madeira casks
- Tullamore D.E.W. 12 Year Old Sherry Cask Finished Limited Release (46% ABV, 92 Proof)
- Tullamore D.E.W. Phoenix Limited Edition (55% ABV, 110 Proof): named for a 1785 hot air balloon accident which nearly burned down the town of Tullamore; a blend with a high pot still content; aged in Oloroso sherry casks; originally available in travel retail
- Tullamore D.E.W. 15 Year Old Trilogy Small Batch (40% ABV, 80 Proof): a blend; aged in ex-bourbon, Oloroso and rum casks
- Tullamore D.E.W. Collector's Edition (43% ABV, 86 Proof), triple distilled and finished in Caribbean rum casks

== Popular culture ==
- Tullamore Dew is the whiskey of choice for Lisbeth Salander, the lead character in Stieg Larsson's Millennium novel series.
- In his early days folk singer Dave Van Ronk frequently performed with his trademark stoneware jug of Tullamore D.E.W. on stage next to him.
- In his early letters later collected in The Proud Highway, Hunter S. Thompson makes frequent mention of Tullamore Dew.
- Tullamore Dew is the whiskey of choice for the widow MacDonagh in Kevin Hearne's The Iron Druid Chronicles.
- Best Irish Casked Whiskey Novelty Award 2026 (1st Annual) File:Tullamore Dew - Award Trophy.jpg

== See also ==
- List of whisky brands
