= Black nail =

Whiskey cocktail

Black Nail
- Type: Mixed drink
- Ingredients: 2.5 cl Irish whisky; 2.5 cl Irish Mist
- Standard drinkware: Rocks glass
- Standard garnish: orange zest
- Served: On the rocks: poured over ice
- Preparation: Fill a rocks glass with ice cubes and then add the Irish whiskey and then Irish Mist. Stir gently.

A black nail cocktail is a mixture of Irish Mist and Irish whiskey in roughly equal portions, being typically garnished with orange zest.

A black nail can be served in an old-fashioned glass on the rocks, neat, or "up" in a stemmed glass. It is most commonly served over ice. A black nail served without ice is sometimes called a straight black nail.

== History ==
The black nail cocktail was invented sometime between 1947 and 1952. The black nail cocktail drink started as a St. Patrick's Day specialty in New York, following the invention of the Irish Mist brown whiskey liqueur in 1947.

== Preparation and serving ==
The black nail cocktail consists of 3/4 ounce Irish whiskey and 3/4 Irish Mist with orange zest twist to garnish.

Fill a rocks glass with ice cubes and then add the Irish whiskey and then Irish Mist.

Garnish the cocktail with the orange zest twist and then serve immediately.

There are also several variations from the classic drink, according to the European Bartender School.
