= Irish Mist =

Irish whiskey-based liqueur

- Type: Liqueur
- Distributor: Heaven Hill Distilleries
- Origin: Ireland
- Introduced: 1947
- Alcohol by volume: 35%
- Proof (US): 70°
- Colour: Deep golden red
- Flavour: Irish whiskey with honey and complex spice notes
- Ingredients: Irish whiskey, honey, herbs
- Website: www.irishmist.com

Irish Mist is an Irish whiskey-based liqueur produced in Newark, Ireland, by the Irish Mist Liqueur Company Ltd. In September 2010 it was announced that the brand was being bought by Gruppo Campari from William Grant, only a few months after Grants had bought it from the C&C Group. It was then sold to Heaven Hill in 2017. It is made from aged Irish whiskey, heather and clover honey, aromatic herbs, and other spirits, blended to an ancient recipe claimed to be 1,000 years old. Though it was once 40% alcohol per volume (or 80 US proof), Irish Mist is now 35% (70 US proof). The bottle shape has also been changed from a "decanter" style to a more traditional whiskey bottle shape. It is currently available in more than 40 countries.

== History ==
Irish Mist was the first liqueur to be produced in Ireland when commercial production began in 1947 at Tullamore, County Offaly. Tullamore is the hometown of the Williams family, the original owners of Irish Mist. The company's history dates back to 1829, when the Tullamore Distillery was founded to produce Irish whiskey. In the mid-1940s, Desmond E. Williams began the search for an alternative yet related product, eventually deciding to produce a liqueur based on the ancient beverage known as heather wine.

In 1985, the Cantrell & Cochrane Group purchased the Irish Mist Liqueur Company from the Williams family. In the summer of 2010, William Grant of Scotland bought Irish Mist and the entire spirit division of C&C. In September 2010 they in turn sold Irish Mist to Gruppo Campari. In 2017, the brand was sold to Heaven Hill.

== Recipes ==
Irish Mist is typically served straight up or on ice, but it also pairs well with coffee, vodka, or cranberry juice. Per the makers, Irish Mist's most popular recipe is Irish Mist with Cola and Lime. A Rusty Mist is an ounce of Irish Mist with an ounce of Drambuie Scotch whisky liqueur.

A black nail is made from equal parts Irish Mist and Irish whiskey.
