= Tullamore Distillery =

Distillery in County Offaly, Ireland

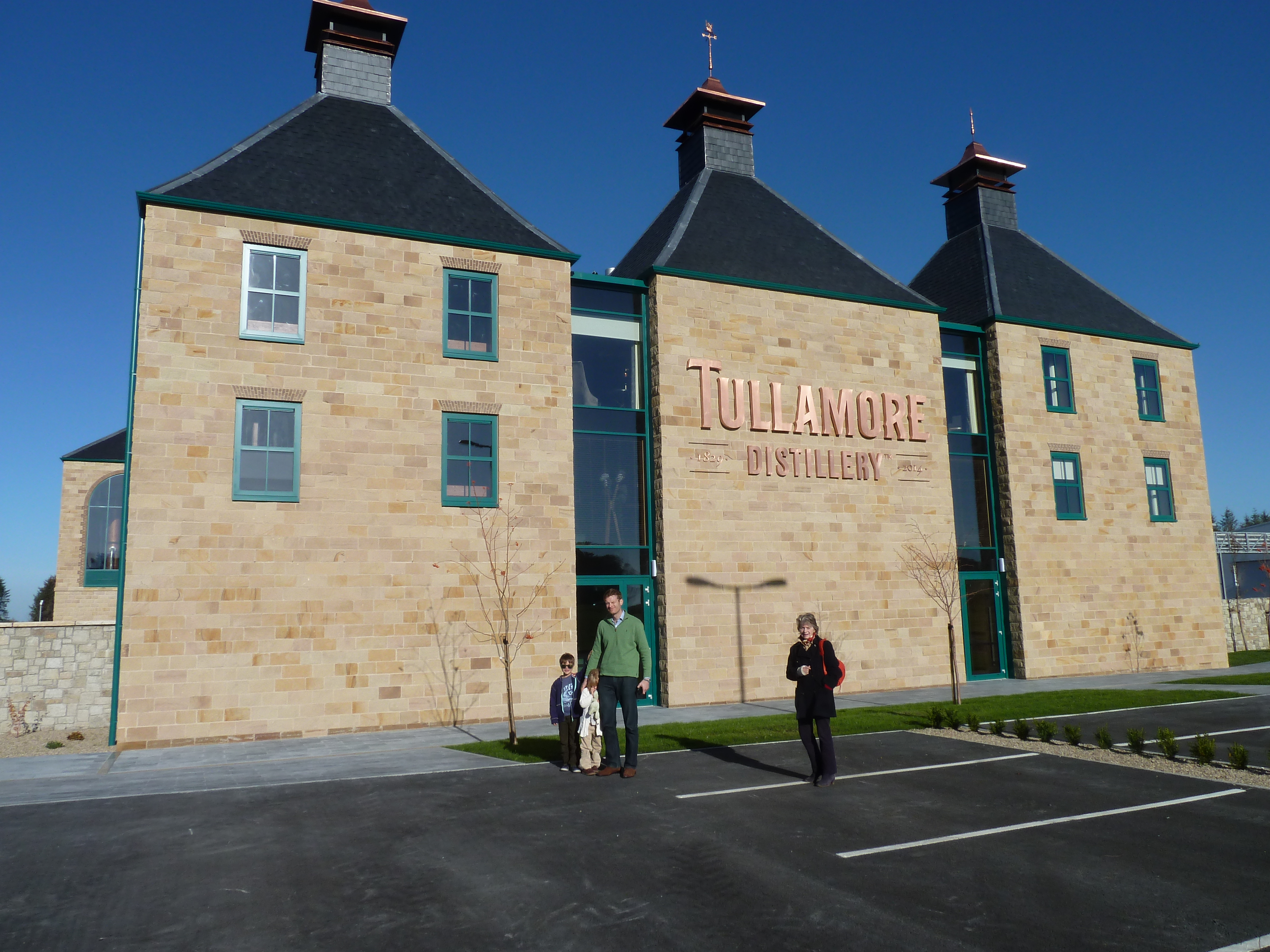
- Location: Tullamore
- Coordinates: 53°15′15″N 7°29′57″W
- Owner: William Grant & Sons
- Founded: 2014
- Architect: Acanthus Architects
- Status: Operating
- Water source: Sliabh Bloom Mountains
- No. of stills: Four pot stills
- Capacity: 1.5 million cases per annum
- Website: tullamoredew.com

Tullamore D.E.W.
- ABV: 40%

The Tullamore Distillery is an Irish whiskey distillery located in Tullamore, County Offaly, Ireland, established in 2014 and owned by William Grant & Sons. It is the first new distillery to have been constructed on a greenfield site in Ireland in over 100 years, and the first to operate in Tullamore since 1954.

Built at a cost of €35 million, construction of the distillery is proceeding on a phased basis. When first constructed, the distillery initially had the capacity to produce up to 1.8 million litres of pot still and malt whiskey per annum using four pot stills. However, provision has been made for the installation of a further two pot stills in the distillery, which would double this capacity to 3.6 million litres per annum. Following an additional €25 million investment, a grain distillery and bottling plant were added in 2017. The installation of a grain distillery means that the distillery can now produce all three components (pot still, malt, and grain whiskey) of its Tullamore D.E.W. blended whiskey on-site.

== Background ==
In 1829, the Old Tullamore Distillery was established in Tullamore. In the late 1800s, the General manager, and later owner of the distillery, Daniel E. Williams, launched a whiskey named Tullamore D.E.W., whose name was taken from his initials, D.E.W. Although the whiskey gained significant success, the distillery later closed in 1954 having suffered financial difficulties. However, the brand was kept alive.

In 2010, William Grant & Sons purchased the brand, the second largest Irish whiskey brand globally, from its then owners, the C&C Group. At the time, Tullamore D.E.W. was produced under contract by Irish Distillers at the Midleton Distillery in County Cork.

As expansion of the brand was limited by their capacity to obtain spirit from Irish Distillers, William Grant & Sons opted to construct their own distillery in Tullamore, the brand's original home.
