= Macra na Feirme =

Irish youth organisation

- Formation: 1944; 82 years ago
- Founder: Stephen Cullinan
- Region served: Ireland
- Services: Voluntary youth organisation
- Members: 13,500
- President: Josephine O’Neill
- Website: www.macra.ie

Macra na Feirme (Irish pronunciation: [ˈmˠakɾˠə n̪ˠə ˈfʲɛɾʲəmʲə]; officially meaning 'stalwarts of the land') is an Irish voluntary rural youth organisation. It provides a social outlet for members in sport, travel, public speaking, performing arts, community involvement and agriculture.

The organisation rebranded in September 2022 by shortening the organisation to Macra.

== History ==
Macra na Feirme was founded in 1944 by Stephen Cullinan, a rural science teacher. The organisation's original purpose was to provide young farmers with adequate training to ensure their livelihood and to provide an outlet for socialising in rural areas. Athy Town Hall became the national headquarters of the organisation in September 1947.

The organisation has been involved in the establishment of:

- Irish Farmers Journal
- Irish Creamery Milk Suppliers Association
- Foróige (up to 1982 known as Macra na Tuaithe)
- National Farmers' Association (now the Irish Farmers' Association)
- Farm Apprenticeship Scheme

Since its foundation, over 250,000 young people have passed through the ranks of Macra na Feirme.

== Organisation ==
Macra membership is open to everyone aged 17–40 (although members must be under 35 to take part in competitions).

As of June 2025, Macra na Feirme had over 10,000 members in approximately 150 clubs around Ireland.

== See also ==
- Blue Jean Country Queen Festival
- Queen of the Land Festival
