= Michael Kelly (Jesuit) =

Irish Jesuit priest and missionary (1929–2021)

Professor Father Michael J. Kelly S.J. Ph.D. LL.D.
- Born: 19 May 1929; Tullamore, County Offaly, Ireland
- Died: 15 January 2021 (aged 91); Zambia
- Citizenship: Irish, then Zambian
- Education: University College Dublin; University of Birmingham
- Religion: Catholic
- Ordained: 1961
- Congregations served: Society of Jesus
- Website: fathermichaelkellyzambia.org

Fr. Michael J. Kelly (19 May 1929 – 15 January 2021) was an Irish Jesuit priest and missionary in Zambia. He is known for his education work around the HIV-AIDS pandemic.

== Early life ==
Michael J. Kelly was born in Tullamore into a family of seven, three of whom (Michael, Joseph and Robert (Bob)) became Jesuit priests. While training as a Jesuit priest, he studied at University College Dublin gaining first-class honours BA in maths and mathematical physics in 1951 and an MA in 1952, continuing his formation he gained licentiate in philosophy in 1955.

== Religious life ==
In 1955 Kelly was sent to Northern Rhodesia as a missionary. He taught mathematics at the Canisius School. He was ordained in 1961, and later became principal of the school. Then, he received a doctorate in education from the University of Birmingham. In the mid-60s, he became a citizen of the new Republic of Zambia. Fr. Kelly then established centres for education, veterinary science and agriculture in Lusaka. He was then elected Dean of Education at the University of Zambia and, subsequently, Deputy Vice-Chancellor and Professor of Education.

Fr. Kelly was intimately involved in planning for health education during the HIV/AIDS pandemic in Zambia.

== Honours ==
In 2006, Fr. Kelly received an honorary degree Doctor of Laws from UCD. In 2012, he received an honorary degree from the Royal College of Surgeons in Ireland.

In 2012, Prof. Kelly was awarded one of the first Presidential Awards for Irish Abroad for his contributions to Peace, Reconciliation and Development, from the Irish Government.

In 2018, Professor Kelly received the Order of Distinguished Service from President Edgar Lungu.

In 2020, he appeared on an Irish postage stamp as part of a series honouring "The Irish Abroad."

== See also ==
- HIV/AIDS in Zambia
- Relationship between education and HIV/AIDS
- List of people on the postage stamps of Ireland
