= Queen of the Land Festival =

The Queen of the Land Festival is an annual festival in County Offaly, Ireland, hosted by Offaly Macra na Feirme in which young women compete for the title "Queen of the Land" based on their "appearance, personality, energy, confidence, dress sense, rural knowledge and elocution".

The festival was initiated by the Irish Farmers Journal in 1964 as part of the Kilkenny beer festival. The competition was then taken over by Offaly Macra three years later.

County Meath has had six queens crowned over the years. County Laois, County Kilkenny and County Limerick come second with four titles each.

The competition has had to be postponed on a number of occasions, starting with 2001; owing to the foot-and-mouth disease crisis that hit Ireland that year. It was once again suspended between 2019 and 2022 due to the COVID-19 pandemic. As of 2026, the competition has not been held since 2023.

The host county has only won the competition twice; Michelle Cody won in 1994 and Sinead Mulcahy in 2009, both from the Shinrone Macra Club.

2005 was the 40th anniversary of the festival. As part of the celebrations, all former Queens were invited back to Tullamore to join in the festivities for the weekend.

== Previous winners ==
=== 1960s winners ===
- 1964 – Phyllis Finnegan (née Ward) – County Meath
- 1965 – Marie Grey (née Curtis) – County Meath
- 1966 – Joan Caulfield – County Roscommon
- 1967 – Breda Keneavy – County Westmeath
- 1968 – Ann Kelly (née Minahan) – County Clare
- 1969 – Elleen Cloney – County Wexford

=== 1970s winners ===
- 1970 – Jennifer McKenna (née Redpath) – County Meath
- 1971 – Moira Miller (née Hardgrove) – County Laois
- 1972 – Shelia Motherway (née Hallahan) – County Waterford
- 1973 – Elizabeth Sharkey (née Kelly) – County Wicklow
- 1974 – Joan O’Keeffe (née Bergin) – County Kilkenny
- 1975 – Mary O’Connor – County Cork
- 1976 – Philomena Byrne (née Collins) – County Meath
- 1977 – Mary Monaghan (née Harte) – County Kildare
- 1978 – Rosaleen Gallagher (née Gilsenan) – County Meath
- 1979 – Catherine Gorman (née Coffey) – County Kilkenny

=== 1980s winners ===
- 1980 – Aine Kent – County Wicklow
- 1981 – Ornagh Darcy (née O’Mahoney) – County Wexford
- 1982 – Ann Dempsey (née Ryan) – County Wicklow
- 1983 – Ann Kavanagh (née Alrey) – County Waterford
- 1984 – Kathleen Murphy (née Sinnott) – County Laois
- 1985 – Helena Connolly (née McElvaney) – County Monaghan
- 1986 – Margaret McPaddan (née Quinn) – County Donegal
- 1987 – Eillsh Rahill (née Kirk) – County Louth
- 1988 – Clare Dillon – County Galway
- 1989 – Ann Marie McHugh – County Kildare

=== 1990s winners ===
- 1990 – Chris Clifford – County Limerick
- 1991 – Alice Lynch – County Sligo
- 1992 – Marie Vines – County Cork
- 1993 – Michelle Sheerin – County Sligo
- 1994 – Michelle Cody – County Offaly
- 1995 – Josephine Rodgers – County Roscommon
- 1996 – Audrey Salley – County Kildare
- 1997 – Caroline Glancy – County Roscommon
- 1998 – Lorraine Morrissey – County Tipperary
- 1999 – Mairead McEvoy – County Kilkenny

=== 2000s winners ===
- 2000 – Anita Meagher – County Waterford
- 2001 – N/A – N/A
- 2002 – Eimear O’Brien – County Wicklow
- 2003 – Caroline Tuite – County Meath
- 2004 – Catherine McCollum – County Cavan
- 2005 – Elaine Murphy – County Kilkenny
- 2006 – Breda Goulding – County Laois
- 2007 – Yvonne Daly – County Cork
- 2008 – Kate Harrison – County Dublin
- 2009 – Sinead Mulcahy – County Offaly

=== 2010s winners ===
- 2010 – Sherine Prendergast – County Tipperary, South
- 2011 – Bernie Woods – County Kilkenny
- 2012 – Teresa Brennan – County Laois
- 2013 – Geraldine Barrett – Carbury Region, County Cork
- 2015 -–Christine Buckley – County Kerry
- 2014 – Orla Murphy – County Galway
- 2017 – Emma Birchall – County Kildare
- 2018 – Louise Crowley – County Limerick
- 2019 – Sinead Conroy – County Roscommon

=== 2020s winners ===
- 2020 – N/A – N/A
- 2021 – N/A – N/A
- 2022 – Rachel McNamara – County Limerick
- 2023 – Sarah Baker – County Limerick
- 2024 – N/A – N/A
- 2025 – N/A – N/A
