= Charleville Castle =

Gothic-style castle in County Offaly, Ireland

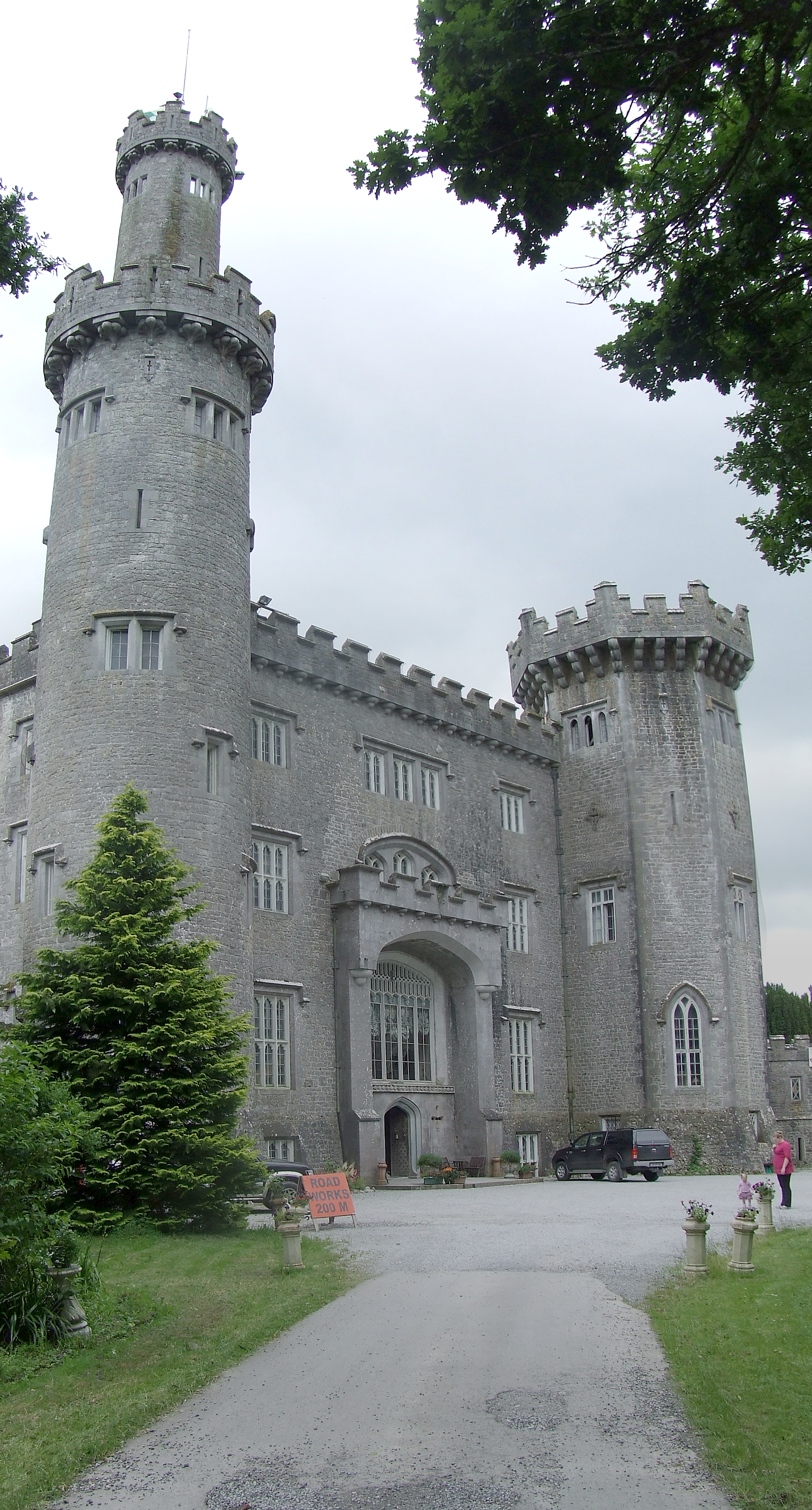
- The castle entrance in 2008
- Interactive map of the Charleville Castle area

General information
- Type: Country House
- Architectural style: Gothic revival
- Location: Tullamore, County Offaly
- Coordinates: 53.2604°N 7.5279°W
- Construction started: 1798
- Completed: 1814

Design and construction
- Architect: Francis Johnston

Website
- charlevillecastle.ie

Charleville Castle is a Gothic-style castle located in County Offaly, Ireland, bordering the town of Tullamore, near the River Clodiagh. It is considered one of the finest of its type in the country.

== History ==
The first mansion house to be built on the site of Charleville Castle was by Thomas Moore circa 1641. The estate passed through the hands of Charles Moore, Lord Tullamore, grandson of Thomas, and when he died in 1674 it went via his sister Jane to Charles William Bury. Charles William was later (1806) created the 1st Earl of Charleville in a second creation of the title. The new earl decided to build a new house on the estate. Commissioned in 1798, it was designed by Francis Johnston, and was built between 1800 and 1812.

The castle was not continuously occupied, owing to the castle owners' lack of resources. Each re-opening of the house resulted in the addition of new rooms or refurbishment. This included engaging William Morris, who designed the ceiling within the dining room. The castle played host to Lord Byron, who held many parties here. The house once boasted a painting from 1789 called Henry VIII, Act V, Scene 4 by Matthew William Peters, which having been removed from the house in 1970 is now in a Canadian collection.

The castle remained uninhabited from 1912 when Colonel Howard-Bury left to live in Belvedere House, County Westmeath. By 1968 the roof had been removed. Work on its restoration was commenced by Michael McMullen in 1973 and later by Constance Heavey Seaquist and Bonnie Vance. A Charitable Trust has been formed to help with the restoration.

== Present day ==
As of 2014, the Charleville Castle Heritage Trust was managed by Dudley Stewart, with the day-to-day running handled by volunteers. Events held at the castle have included "fright nights", an auction, and a play by the English Chamber Theatre called Dearest Nancy, Darling Evelyn. The Mór Festival and its successor, Castlepalooza, have been held at the castle, as has Facefest, a not-for-profit festival held in the Summer Solstice Weekend. As of 2014, the castle hosted a museum, "The Explorers' Museum", covering the history of exploration and dedicated to Charles Howard-Bury.

The castle itself has been claimed to be the most haunted building and grounds in Europe, appearing on both Living TV's Most Haunted and Fox's Scariest Places on Earth. The most famous of these ghosts is that of a little girl called Harriet, who reputedly died after a fall in a staircase. The castle has also been visited by several paranormal investigators and psychics. It has been photographed by Simon Marsden, and has appeared on Ghost Hunters International. It was also used as a filming location for Becoming Jane (2007), Northanger Abbey (2007), The Knight Before Christmas (2019) and The Green Knight (2020). The castle has also been used, alongside Ashford Castle in County Mayo, as a set for the "French Court" in the pilot episode of Reign (2013). And most famously for the second season of Wednesday 2025

Charleville Forest, which borders the castle, is classified as a Special Area of Conservation.
