= Dundalk and Newry Steam Packet Company =

British shipping company

- House flag
- Industry: Shipping
- Founded: 1871
- Defunct: 1926
- Fate: Taken over
- Successor: British and Irish Steam Packet Company
- Headquarters: Dundalk
- Area served: Dundalk, Newry, Liverpool

The Dundalk and Newry Steam Packet Company provided shipping services between Dundalk and Liverpool from 1871 to 1926.

== History ==
In 1871 the Dundalk Steam Packet Company amalgamated with the Newry Steam Packet Company to form the Dundalk and Newry Steam Packet Company. This survived until 1926 when it was taken over by the British and Irish Steam Packet Company, part of the Coast Lines group.

Services from Liverpool to Dundalk and Newry ceased in 1968.
