= Dundalk Steam Packet Company =

- Industry: Shipping
- Founded: 1837
- Founder: Neal Kelly
- Defunct: 1871
- Fate: Taken over
- Successor: Dundalk and Newry Steam Packet Company
- Headquarters: Dundalk
- Area served: Dundalk, Liverpool

The Dundalk Steam Packet Company provided shipping services between Dundalk and Liverpool from 1837 to 1871.

== History ==
The company was founded in 1837 by Neal Kelly.

In 1871 the company amalgamated with the Newry Steam Packet Company to form the Dundalk and Newry Steam Packet Company. This survived until 1926 when it was taken over by the British and Irish Steamship Company.

Services from Liverpool to Dundalk and Newry ceased in 1968.
