= List of national monuments in County Wexford =

The Irish state has officially approved the following list of national monuments in County Wexford. In the Republic of Ireland, a structure or site may be deemed to be a "national monument", and therefore worthy of state protection, if it is of national importance. If the land adjoining the monument is essential to protect it, this land may also be protected.

== National Monuments ==
NM#	Monument name	Description	Image	Townland	Location
516	Ballyhack Castle	Castle		Ballyhack	52°14′46″N 6°58′03″W
375	Ballymoty Motte	Motte		Ballymoty More	52°30′20″N 6°27′41″W
521	Ferns Castle	Castle		Ferns	52°35′27″N 6°29′58″W
665	Clone Church	Church		Clone	52°34′06″N 6°30′18″W
644	Coolhull Castle	Fortified House		Coolhull	52°14′03″N 6°42′18″W
192	Dunbrody Abbey	Abbey (Cistercian)		Dunbrody	52°17′01″N 6°57′33″W
668	Duncannon Artillery Fort	Artillery fort		Duncannon	52°13′15″N 6°56′12″W
457	Tacumshane Windmill	Windmill		Tacumshane	52°12′32″N 6°25′26″W
133	Ferns Church	Church		Ferns	52°35′31″N 6°29′26″W
133	Ferns Abbey	Priory (Augustinian)		Ferns	52°35′22″N 6°29′30″W
443	St. Mary's Church	Church		New Ross	52°23′47″N 6°56′27″W
434	Rathmacknee Castle	Castle		Rathmacknee Great	52°16′09″N 6°29′26″W
229	Rathumney Castle	Castle		Rathumney	52°17′43″N 6°52′28″W
429	Slade Castle	Castle		Slade	52°08′02″N 6°54′38″W
392	Vinegar Hill Windmill	Windmill		Templeshannon	52°30′06″N 6°33′13″W
506, 614	Tintern Abbey	Abbey (Cistercian), Church & bridge		Tintern	52°14′13″N 6°50′18″W
445	St. Selskar's Priory	Church (Augustinian)		Wexford	52°20′29″N 6°27′57″W

== Sources ==
- National Monuments in County Wexford
