= R175 road (Ireland) =

Road in Ireland

R175 road
- Bóthar R175
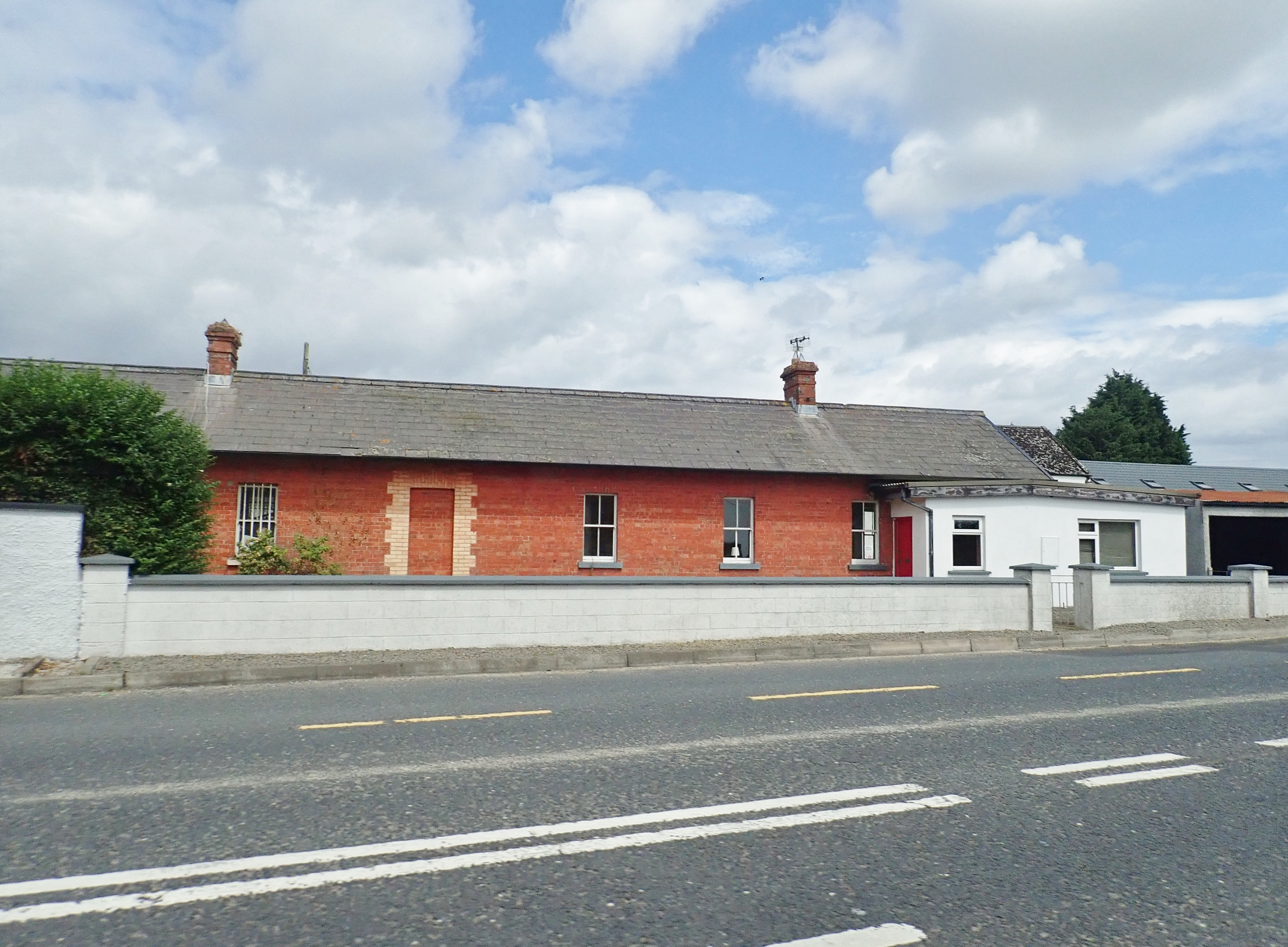
- Former railway station at The Bush, County Louth, on the R175

Location
- Country: Ireland

Highway system
- Roads in Ireland; Motorways; Primary; Secondary; Regional

The R175 road is a regional road in Ireland, running its full length on the Cooley Peninsula in County Louth. It runs northeast from its junction with the R173 at The Bush to its terminal point at Greenore Port via Rogan's Cross, Saint James' Well; and the Shore Road at Greenore all in the County Louth. Two kilometres (1.2 mi) south of Greenore it is joined by the R176 from nearby Carlingford. The road is 6 km (3.7 mi) long.

== See also ==
- Roads in Ireland
- National primary road
- National secondary road
