= Omeath =

Village in County Louth, Ireland

Omeath Ó Méith
- Town
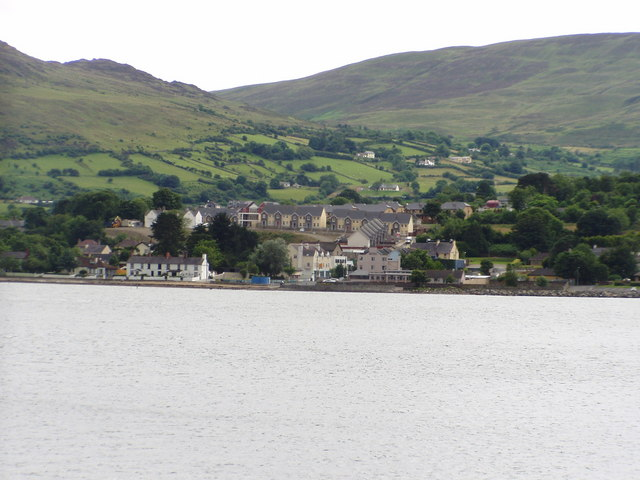
- Looking across Carlingford Lough to Omeath

- Location in Ireland
- Coordinates: 54°05′24″N 6°15′30″W
- Country: Ireland
- Province: Leinster
- County: County Louth
- Barony: Dundalk Lower

Population (2016)
  - Total: 603
- Time zone: UTC+0 (WET)
  - Summer (DST): UTC-1 (IST (WEST))
- Irish Grid Reference: J137168

Omeath (/oʊˈmiːð/; Irish: Ó Méith or Uí Meth) is a village on the Cooley Peninsula in the north of County Louth in Ireland, close to the border with both County Armagh and County Down in Northern Ireland. It is roughly midway between Dublin and Belfast, very near the County Louth and County Armagh/County Down border. As of the 2016 census, Omeath had a population of 603, up from 439 during the 2006 census. It is approximately 6 km (3.7 mi) from Carlingford and about 8 km (5.0 mi) from Newry. By sea, Omeath's nearest land neighbour is Warrenpoint on the south County Down coast. Omeath lies within the historical barony of Dundalk Lower.

== Name ==
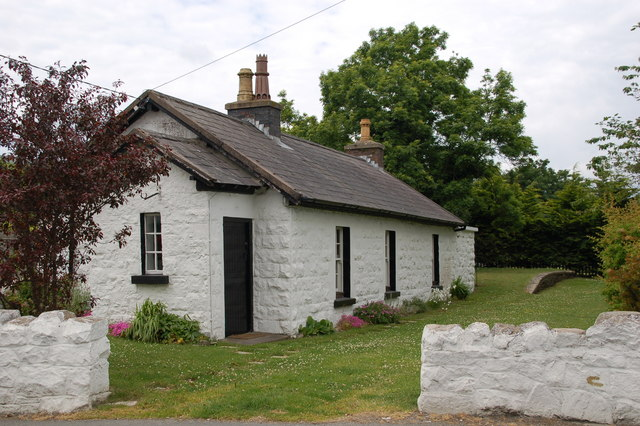
The former Omeath railway station

It is named after Muireadheach Méith (méith meaning 'the fat') and was originally called Uí Méith Mara, 'by the sea', to distinguish it from another Ó Méith named after the same man.

== History ==
Omeath was a village that sprung up around the old Omeath railway station in 1876. The town attracted day-trippers from around Northern Ireland and elsewhere, but, unlike nearby Warrenpoint, Omeath never became a major residential centre. Smuggling was common, especially around the time of the Emergency (WWII). One mid-19th century source reports that the town had little arable land and residents survived mostly by selling fish.

== Irish language ==
Speakers of Irish existed in Omeath until the middle of the 20th century. The last native speaker of Omeath Irish was Anne O'Hanlon (Anna Uí Annluain), who died in 1960 aged 89. Although the dialect is now extinct, recordings have been made by German linguist Wilhelm Doegen for the Royal Irish Academy (RIA).

== Transport ==
The town is located on the R173 regional road.

Omeath railway station was on the Dundalk, Newry and Greenore railway, which opened on 1 August 1876 and finally closed on 1 January 1952.

A regular bus service runs through the village and links the village with Newry and Dundalk. Bus Éireann Route 161 operates Monday to Friday, and Halpenny Travel operate a service on Sundays with journeys to Dundalk and Newry. In the summer months, a regular foot passenger ferry service operates between Omeath and Warrenpoint in County Down. Bikes and small motorcycles can also use this service during the summer months.

== Sport ==
Omeath is home to the Cúchulainn Gaels GAA (Gaelic Athletic Association) club.

== See also ==
- List of towns and villages in the Republic of Ireland
