= Omeath railway station =

Former railway station in County Louth, Ireland

Omeath
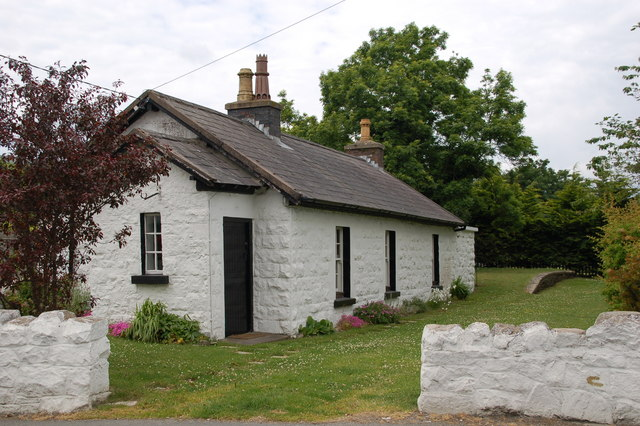
- Omeath railway station in County Louth.

General information
- Location: Omeath, County Louth; Ireland; Ireland
- Coordinates: 54.08477°N 6.25151°W

History
- Pre-grouping: Dundalk, Newry and Greenore Railway

Key dates
- 1 August 1876: Station opened
- 1 January 1952: Station closed
- Dundalk, Newry and Greenore Railway formally wound up: 1957
Location

Omeath railway station was a railway station in County Louth, it was opened as a part of the Dundalk, Newry and Greenore Railway. The rail ran a service to the port at Greenore. From Greenore, ferries ran to Holyhead in Wales, and onward trains to London Euston. The station opened on 1 August 1876. In 1867 the railway was absorbed by the London & North Western Railway. The station finally closed on 1 January 1952.
