= Cúchulainn Gaels (Louth) =

Louth-based Gaelic games club

Cúchulainn Gaels GFC
- CLG Ghaeil Chúchulainn
- Founded: 2005
- County: Louth
- Colours: Black and Amber
- Grounds: Páirc Naomh Lorcan, Chapel Hill, Omeath, County Louth
- Coordinates: 54.0818°N 6.2590°W

Playing kits
Standard colours

Cúchulainn Gaels GFC is a Gaelic football club located in Omeath, on the north-eastern side of the Cooley Peninsula in County Louth, Ireland. It fields teams in competitions organised by Louth GAA and recruits players from the neighbouring peninsula villages of Omeath and Carlingford. The club competes in the Louth Junior Championship and Division 3B of the county football Leagues. As of 2022, Noel Litchfield was the senior team manager.

== History ==
The club was formed in July 2005, making it the youngest Gaelic football club in the county. The club colours of black and amber are the same as those of the former Omeath secondary school, St. Michael's. Then GAA President Seán Kelly spoke at the official launch of the club in March 2006. Cúchulainn Gaels made their debut in Louth adult football in 2006, when a team was entered in the Louth Junior 2B Championship and Division 4C of the county football Leagues.

In 2007, the Gaels claimed their first win in a competitive match and at juvenile level the Under-13s won the Louth 'C' Féile title by beating Clan na Gael in the final. Former inter-county player Pádraig O'Neill managed the senior side in 2007.

The club's minor team, amalgamating with Peninsula neighbours Cooley Kickhams, won the Louth Minor Football Championship in 2020. In the same year, the Gaels had two representatives on the county minor side - Paul Brennan and Callum O'Hanlon.

In 2021, the club's seniors won their first ever match in the Louth Junior Football Championship, defeating Dowdallshill 1–07 to 0–08. This was followed up shortly afterwards with a win over Seán McDermott's, thus ensuring the team qualified for the knockout stage of the Championship for the first time in its history.
