= Athlumney Castle =

- Caisleán Áth Luimnigh (Irish)
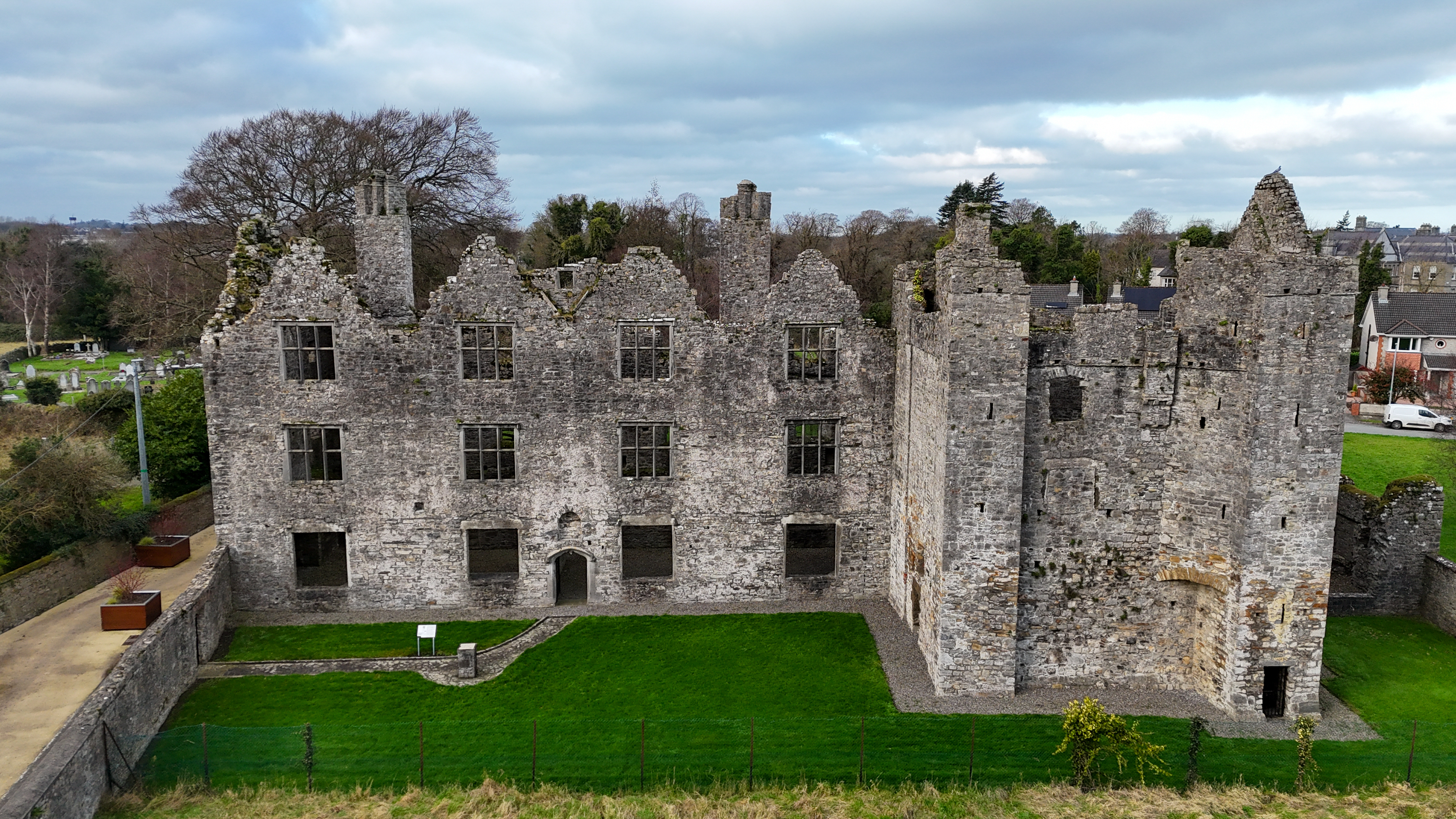
- Athlumney Castle in 2025

- Location within Ireland
- 53.650310°N 6.675050°W
- Type: Castle (tower house and fortified house)
- Location: Convent Road, Navan, County Meath, Ireland

History
- Built: 15th–17th century

Site notes
- Area: Boyne Valley
- Architectural style: Tudor

National monument of Ireland
- Official name: Athlumney Castle
- Reference no.: 287

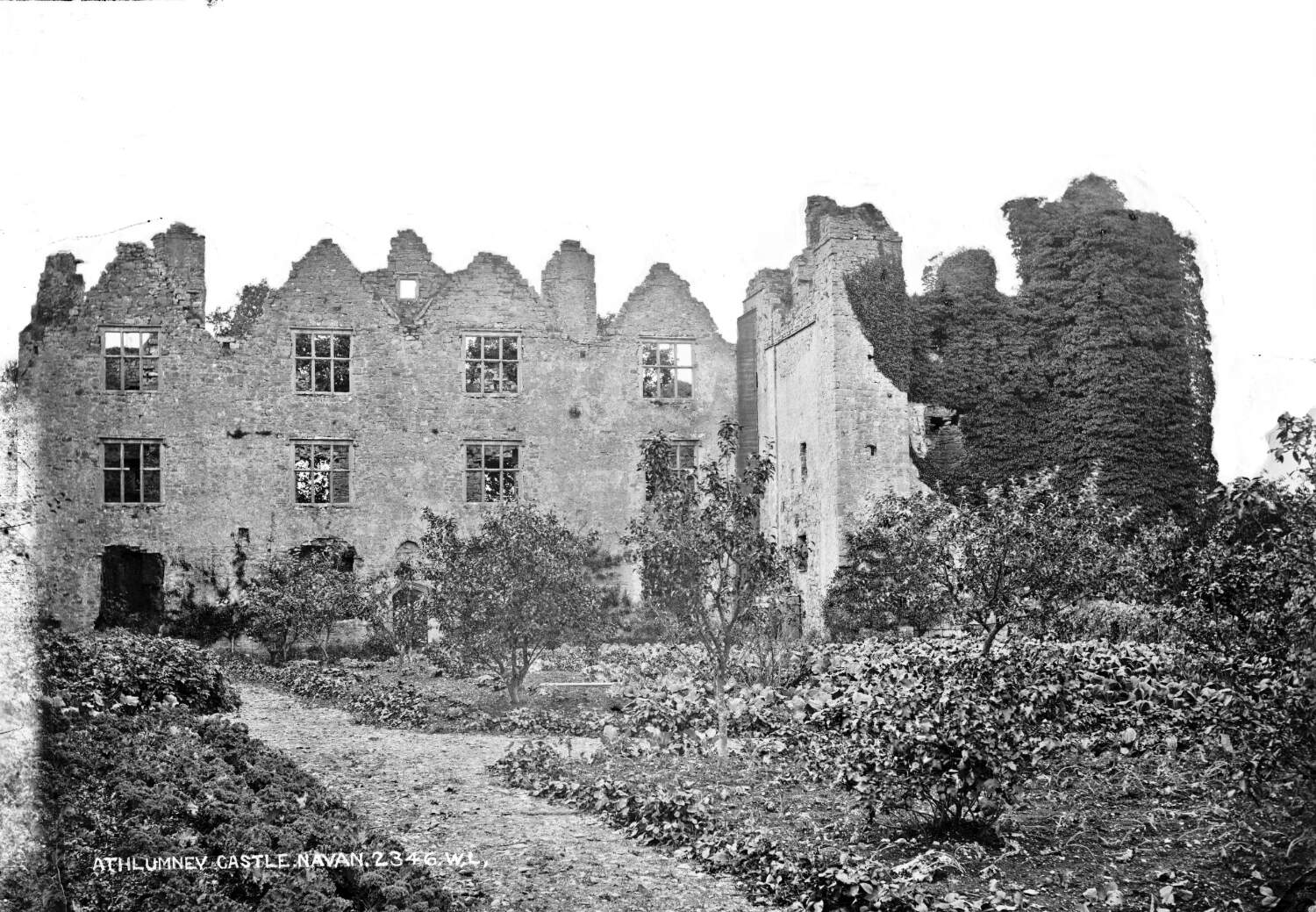
Glass plate photograph by Robert French, taken between 1865 and 1914

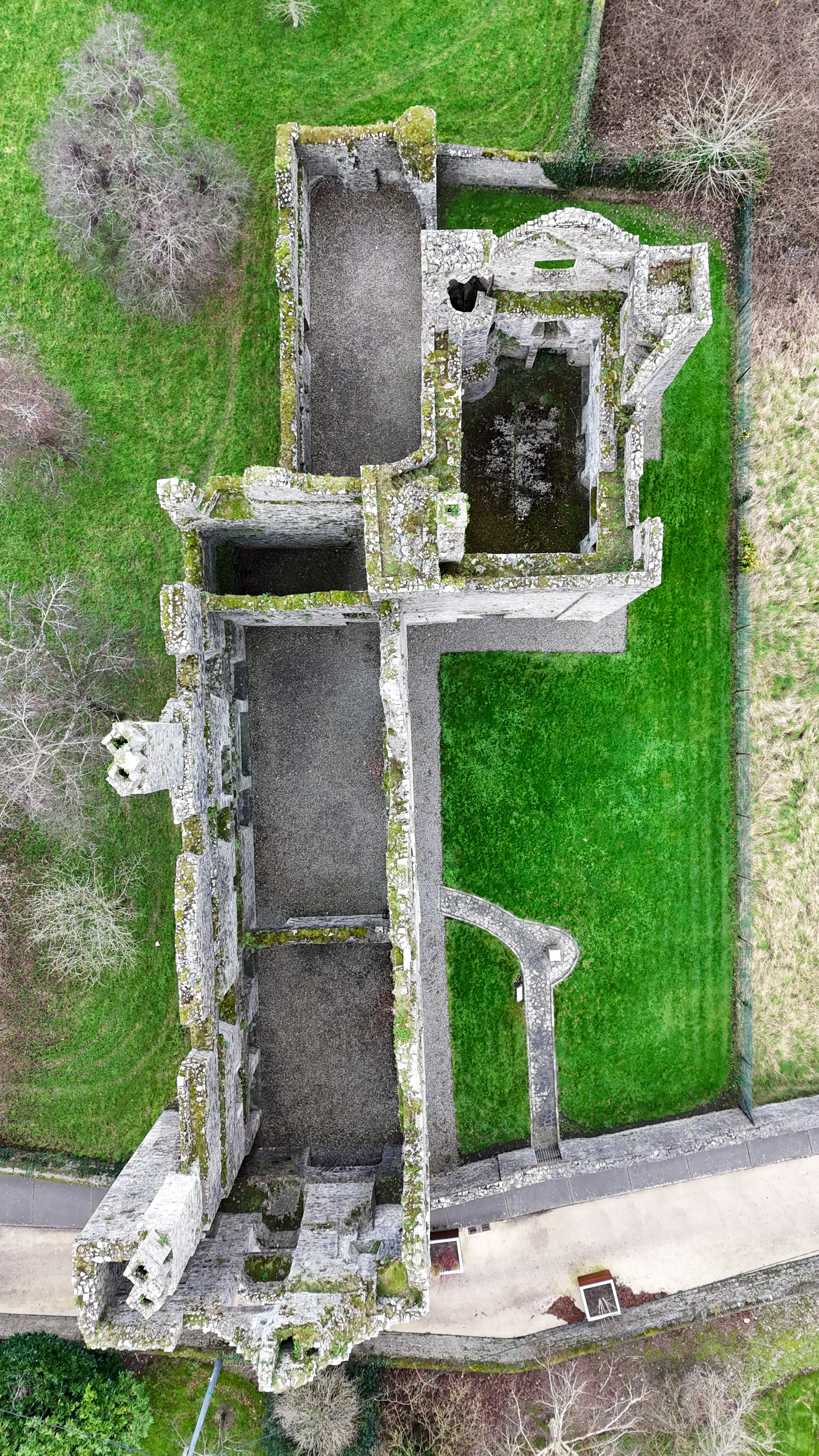
Athlumney Castle aerial photograph

Athlumney Castle (Irish: Caisleán Áth Luimnigh) is a tower house and fortified house and a National Monument in Navan, Ireland.

The site remains accessible to the public; to enter, visitors need to place a deposit at the nearby B&B and receive a key.

== Location ==
Athlumney Castle is located on Convent Road, to the southeast of Navan town centre, east of the Boyne.

== History ==
Athlumney overlooks a key strategic point, where the Leinster Blackwater drains into the Boyne. The place name derives from the Irish for "Loman's ford", referring to Lommán of Trim. Archaeological digs uncovered an Early Christian souterrain.

The motte at Athlumney was built in the years after 1172 when Hugh de Lacy, Lord of Meath granted the title of Baron Skryne to his ally Adam de Feypo; he in turn granted Athlumney to a relative Amauri de Feipo, who built the motte.

The older part of Athlumney Castle is a tower house which was built in the 15th century.

The newer part of the castle is a Tudor-style fortified house attached to the tower. This was built in the late 16th century or early 17th century. It had large corridors and its ground floor kitchen provided heat for the first floor rooms where the Lord lived. The doorway is cut limestone and there is an oriel window on its eastern wall.

In 1649 during Oliver Cromwell's Siege of Drogheda, the Maguire (Mac Uidhir) who held Athlumney Castle burned it down to prevent Cromwell taking possession of it.

The last Lord of Athlumney was Sir Launcelot Dowdall. The Dowdalls lost their land during the Cromwellian Plantation and got it back under Charles II. They backed the Catholic James II and Launcelot Dowdall was High Sheriff of Meath in 1686. After James' defeat at the Battle of the Boyne (which took place just 19 km / 12 mi from Athlumney Castle), Dowdall left for France and supposedly burned the castle down again.

The property later belonged to the Somerville family of Kentstown who took the title of Baron Athlumney.

== Building ==
The older part of Athlumney Castle is a tower house, with three storeys with a spiral staircase and holes for floor beams remaining on the first floor level.

The later Tudor fortified house is also three storeys high, with four sets of widely spaced mullioned windows. It had large corridors and its ground floor kitchen provided heat for the first floor where the Lord and his family lived. The doorway is cut limestone and there is an oriel window in the eastern wall. There are projecting corner turrets. The castle has a barrel vault above the ground floor. The original entrance was protected by a murder-hole leading from a small room below the first floor level.

This reflects a new age, when the Lord moved away from his retainers and lived in a residence with his own family. They lived on the first floor, heated by the kitchen below, with glass open windows and wooden floors.

On the first floor there is a secret mural chamber, reached only by a set of stairs from above, assumed to be a priest hole.
