= Mitchelstown Cave =

Limestone cave in County Tipperary, Ireland

Coordinates: 52.31°N 8.08°W

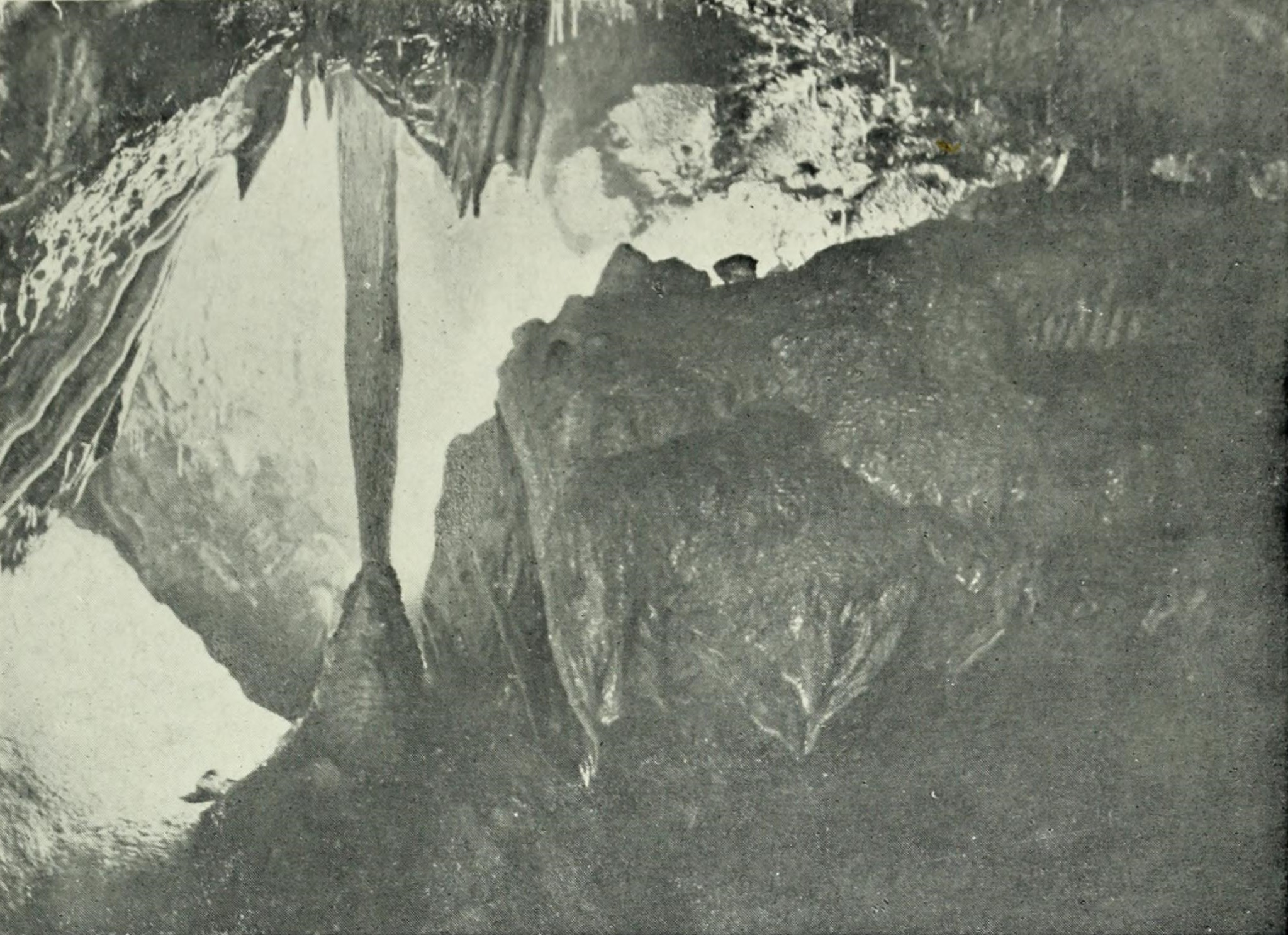
- 1905 photo of speleothems in Mitchelstown Cave.
- Interactive map of Mitchelstown Cave
- Location: Mitchelstown, County Cork
- Discovery: 1833
- Geology: Limestone
- Access: Show cave access only

Mitchelstown Cave is a limestone cave near Burncourt, County Tipperary, Ireland. Situated 12 kilometres (7.5 mi) from Mitchelstown, County Cork, it became the first cave in Ireland to be developed for the public in 1972.

The cave is located near Mitchelstown, County Cork, but is actually in County Tipperary. It is a local landmark and tourist destination, with a number of caverns open to the public through a guided tour. Noteworthy speleothems include the Tower of Babel column. The largest cavern, known as the Tír na Nóg has hosted concerts and events.

== History ==
Mitchelstown Cave was discovered accidentally on the 3rd May 1833 by Micheal Condon while quarrying limestone. After the discovery the cave became a popular destination for visitors. Guided tours were conducted through Mitchelstown Cave by candlelight from 1833 until 1972 when electictiy and footpaths were installed.

Mitchelstown Cave was mapped in 1834 by Professor of Geology at Trinity College Dublin Dr. James Apjohn, and subsequently visited by a large number of eminent scientists and speleologists.In August 1857 Alexander Henry Haliday visited with Edward Percival Wright and recorded a number of animal species present.In 1860 George Victor Du Noyer sketched the Mitchelstown Cave for the Geological Survey of Ireland. Members of the Dublin, Cork and Limerick Naturalist Field Clubs took part in a trip to the cave in July 1894.

In 1895, Édouard-Alfred Martel and H. Lyster Jameson explored and completed a new cave survey.

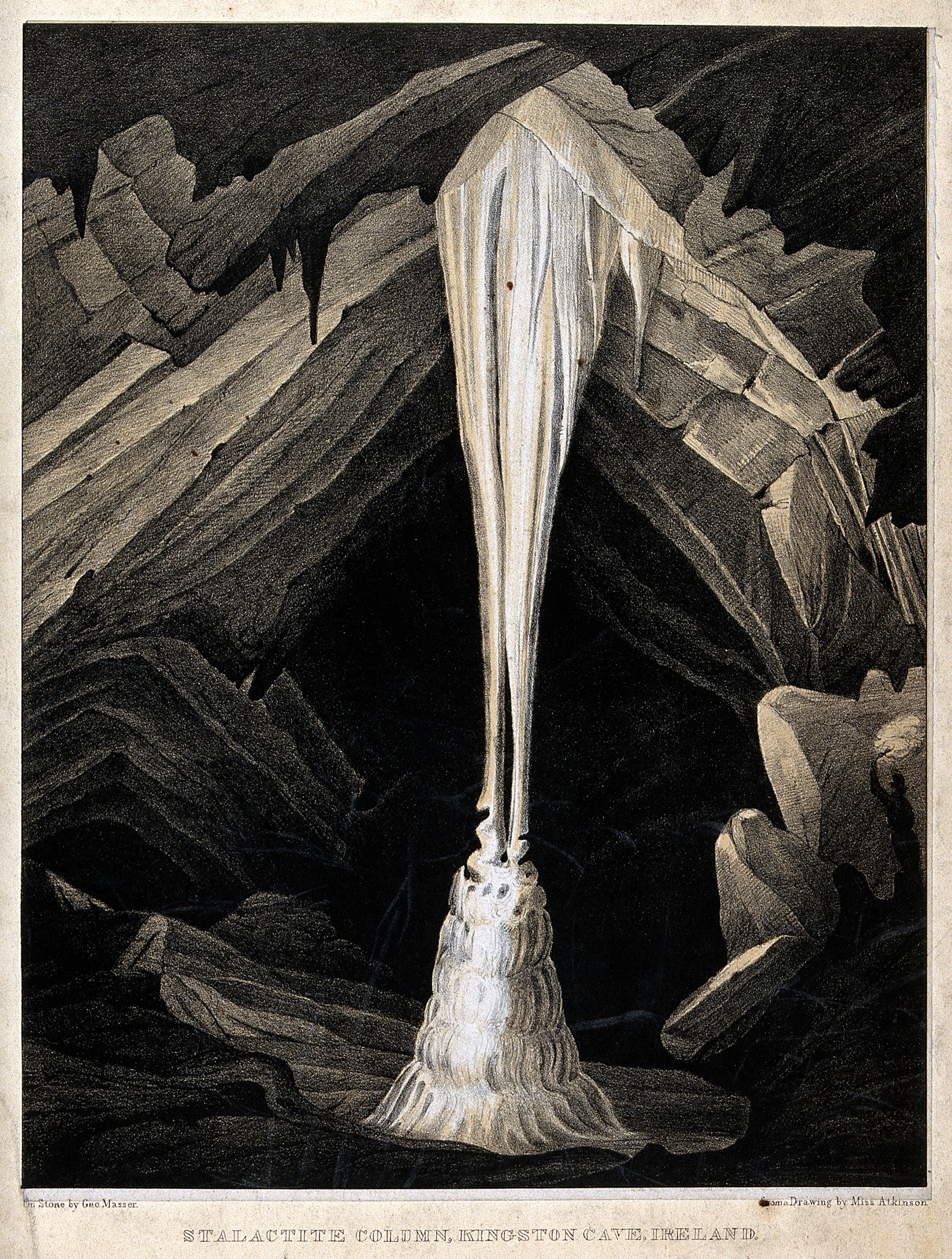
19th century lithograph of a calcite column in "Kingston Cave".

In 1908 the cave was thoroughly explored and surveyed again by Dr C. A. Hill, Dr A. Rule and Harold Brodrick of the Yorkshire Ramblers' Club, along with Robert Lloyd Praeger.
