= Burncourt Castle =

- An Chúirt Dóite (Irish)
- Everard's Castle; The Burned Court; Clogheen Castle
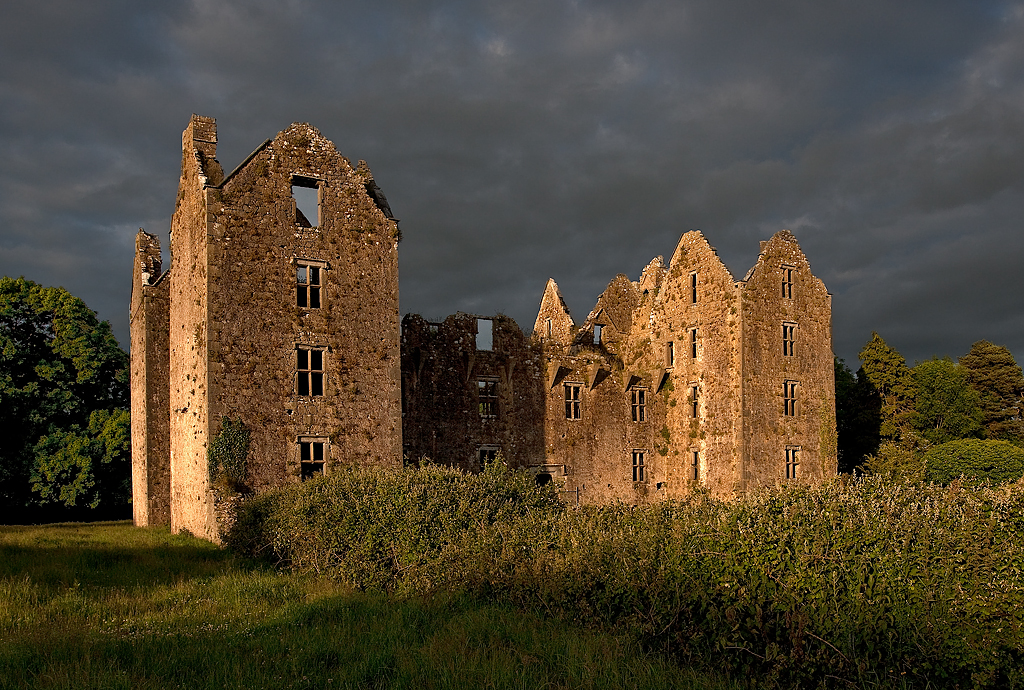

- Location within Ireland
- 52.310015°N 8.069911°W
- Type: Fortified house
- Location: Burncourt, County Tipperary, Ireland

History
- Built: 1641

Site notes
- Elevation: 76 m (249 ft)
- Architectural style: Tudor
- Owner: private

National monument of Ireland
- Official name: Ballynahow Castle
- Reference no.: 370

Burncourt Castle is a fortified house and a National Monument in County Tipperary, Ireland.

== Location ==
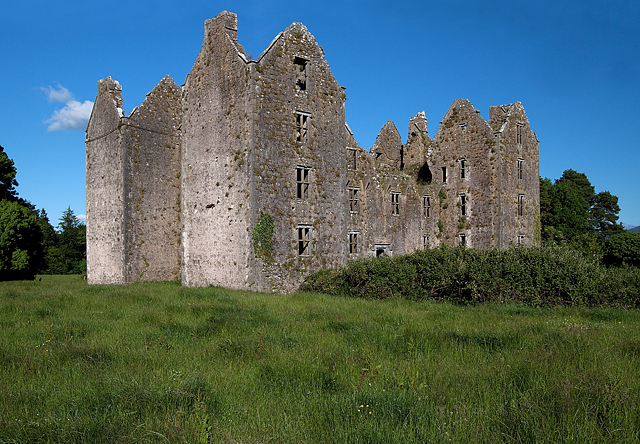
Another view of Burncourt Castle

Burncourt Castle is located 5.4 km (3.4 mi) northwest of Ballyporeen, on the west bank of the River Tar.

== History ==
The castle was originally known as Everard's Castle, and was built by Richard Everard, 1st Baronet (d. 1650), son of politician and judge Sir John Everard. When Richard married Catherine Plunkett in 1620, his father awarded him a large estate around the River Tar.

Around 1639 Sir Richard some of his land and began to build a fortified house. It was complete in 1641, and had 26 gables and seven chimneys. Archeological investigation found a cow skeleton in a pit that extended under the east wall of the castle. The cow appeared to have been killed and dismembered and left as a protective votive offering – the flanks were placed next to each other and the head placed on the upper backbone.

The Everards took up residence just as the Irish Rebellion of 1641 began. In 1642 Sir Richard joined the Catholic Confederates at Kilkenny and became a member of the Supreme Council. Sir Richard's wife Catherine remained at the castle.

In 1649, as Oliver Cromwell's Roundheads advanced on Everard's Castle, Lady Catherine burned it down, earning it the name of the Burned Court.

Sir Richard Everard went on fight at the Siege of Limerick (1650–51), but was captured and hung in 1651 by Henry Ireton. Burncourt was abandoned. According to tradition Burncourt was seven years in building, seven years lived in and seven days burning.

In the early 18th century, the painter Anthony Chearnley built a house adjoining the Burncourt ruin.

The excavation also showed that there was no remaining debris from the castle burning, meaning that the roof slates and lead flashings were salvaged/looted for use elsewhere.

== Building ==
The castle has a rectangular centre block and large square towers at each corner.

There is a long line of corbels over the entrance on the south side and floral motifs on the hood over the doorway.

Burncourt Castle is a large gabled fortified house, with a central block four bays long and four storeys high including basement and attic.

It has four large square flanking towers, each five storeys. Along the front are corbels for a machicolation which runs the full length of the centre block. There is a fine central doorway with a hood mould and decorated label stops. The castle has mullioned and transomed windows with good square hood moulds. There are fireplaces in the east wall, the north wall and within the flanking towers.

Parts of the bawn, with a corner turret, can still be seen nearby.

The cellar floor was cobbled with cobblestones of irregular sizes, and covered 71.6 m^{2} (771 sq ft) with a ceiling 2.37 m (7 ft 9 in) high.
