= Enclosure castle =

Fortified castle featuring walls and towers

An enclosure castle is a fortified residence or stronghold, in which defence is facilitated by walls and towers. Such fortifications were usually composed of wood or stone, but there are later examples built of brick.

== Features ==
In enclosure castles without great towers or keeps, there would often be other buildings including, warden's houses, barracks, kitchens, stables, and chapels. Enclosure castles were commonly constructed in areas of conflict, particularly border regions, including along the England–Wales border. Some enclosure castles were constructed as newly formed ringworks, or were adapted from extant wooden motte-and-bailey structures.

== History ==
The first examples in England were constructed shortly after the Norman conquest, as strongholds for the occupiers. Their form developed in the 12th century as the military experience gained by the crusaders was introduced into their home residences. The majority of extant examples were built in the 13th century, though a few were built in the 14th century. They occur throughout England though more are located near the vulnerable channel ports in Kent and Sussex, and by Edward I along the Welsh borders.

Enclosure castles were constructed from the reign of William I until at least the late 14th century with the construction of Bodiam Castle. The definition of an enclosure castle is debatable, and many would consider later structures designed principally for residence instead of war, including Thornbury Castle, built c. 1511, to be an enclosure castle.

== Further examples ==
Other examples of enclosure castles include Kenilworth Castle, Clitheroe Castle, and Ludlow Castle. Many in England are under the protection of English Heritage, which has counted 126 examples. There are several in Ireland also, for example King John's Castle, Carlingford.
