= R173 road (Ireland) =

Road in Ireland

R173 road
- Bóthar R173
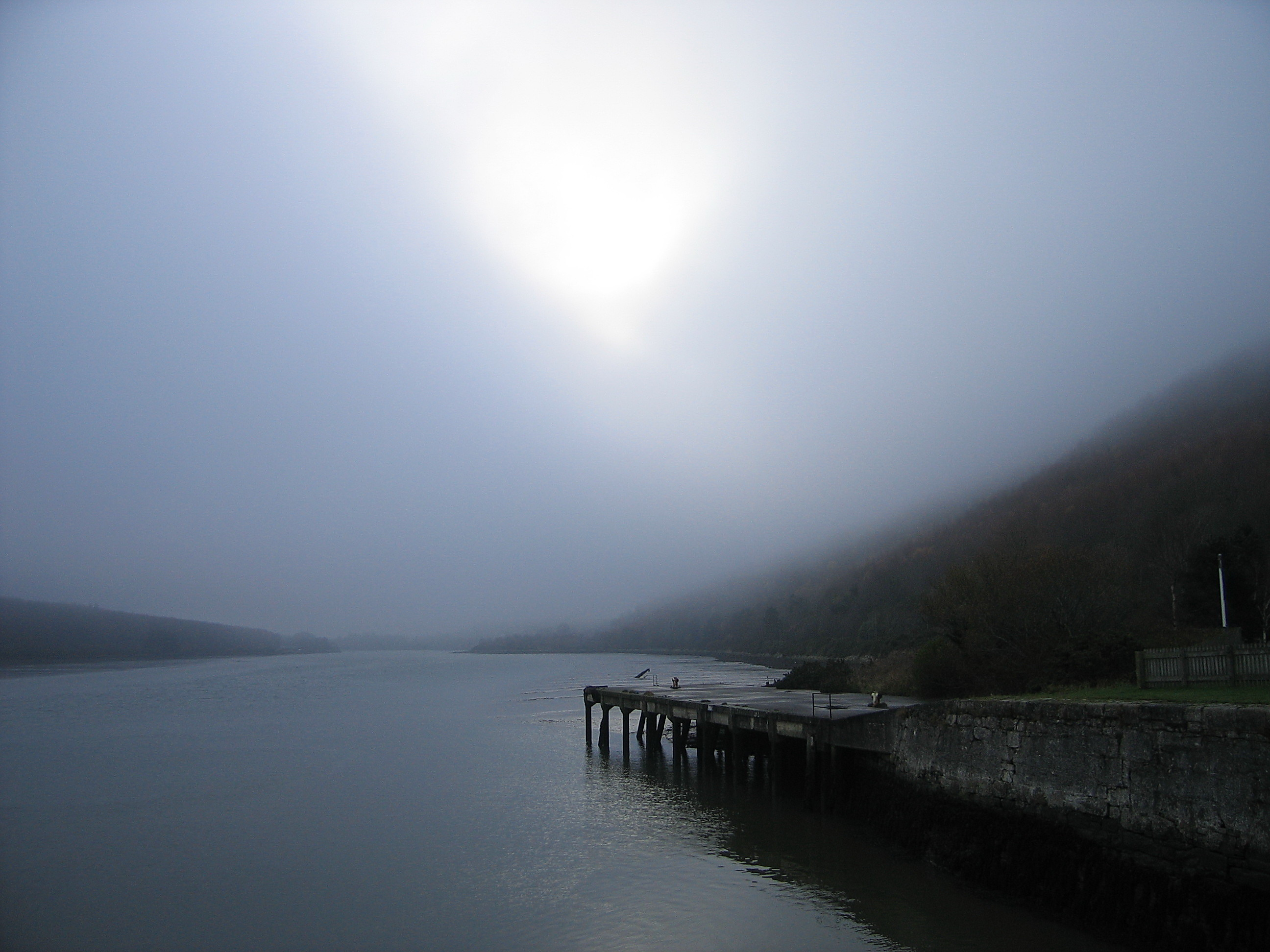
- Carlingford Lough - R173 to Carlingford hugs the coast on the right

Route information
- Length: 32 km (20 mi)

Location
- Country: Ireland
- Primary destinations: County Louth; Dundalk - starts at roundabout north of town (N1/M1 and N52); R174; The Bush (R175); Carlingford (R176); Omeath; Terminates at the NI border; becomes B79

Highway system
- Roads in Ireland; Motorways; Primary; Secondary; Regional

The R173 road is a regional road in Ireland, running its full length in County Louth. It loops around Cooley Peninsula, mainly along the coast. It nearly encircles the Cooley Mountains.

It starts at a roundabout at Ballymascanlan, just north of Dundalk, where it meets the N52 and the M1/N1 roads. It then heads east, along the northern coast of Dundalk Bay to The Bush where it veers north, past the village of Grange to Carlingford. From there it heads NW along the southern shore of Carlingford Lough, through the village of Omeath to the Northern Ireland border where it becomes the B79 into Newry, County Down.

The R173 is a former Trunk Road and was previously numbered as the T62. The road is 32 km (20 mi) long.

In June 2024, construction began on the Narrow Water bridge connecting the road to the A2 road in County Down, under the Shared Island scheme.

== See also ==
- Roads in Ireland
- National primary road
- National secondary road
