= Robertstown Castle =

- Caisleán Bhaile Riobaird (Irish)
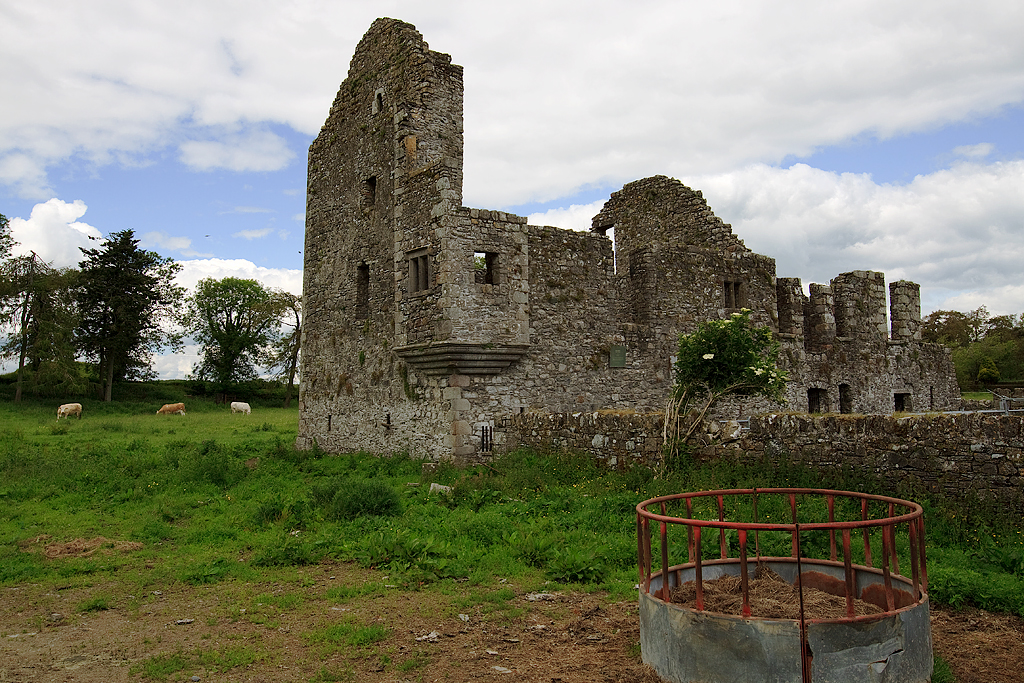

- Location within Ireland
- 53.8016°N 6.8091°W
- Type: fortified house
- Location: Robertstown, Nobber, County Meath, Ireland

History
- Built: early 17th century

Site notes
- Area: Dee Valley

National monument of Ireland
- Official name: Robertstown Castle
- Reference no.: 25

Robertstown Castle is a fortified house and National Monument in County Meath, Ireland.

== Location ==
Robertstown Castle is located in the grounds of Robertstown House, halfway between Moynalty and Nobber.

The castle was part of the O'Reilly family's holdings, until the land was sold upon the death of Valentine O'Reilly. The last O'Reillys to live in Robertstown House, adjacent to the castle, were Valentine & Kay O'Reilly & their children Stephanie, Pauline, Patricia, Charles, Joan, & Bernadette. Said children used to play in the castle in the 1940s and 50s, but now the ruins are protected from entry.

== History ==
Robertstown Castle was built in the early 17th century, which would place its construction some years after the Nine Years' War. The north wing was added at a later date.

One local legend, recorded in the 1930s by the Irish Folklore Commission, tells of a man named "Gutters" who lived in the castle ruins and fired his gun at random at passers-by. He was in turn shot by a priest

== Building ==
Robertstown Castle is a fortified house, three storeys high with square bartizans (projecting turrets) on two opposite corners. These are supported on moulded corbelling similar to that found in Scottish castles.

The castle shows keyhole-shaped loopholes. The ground floor contains a series of vaulted rooms and the first floor has three rooms.
