= R176 road (Ireland) =

Road in Ireland

R176 road
- Bóthar R176
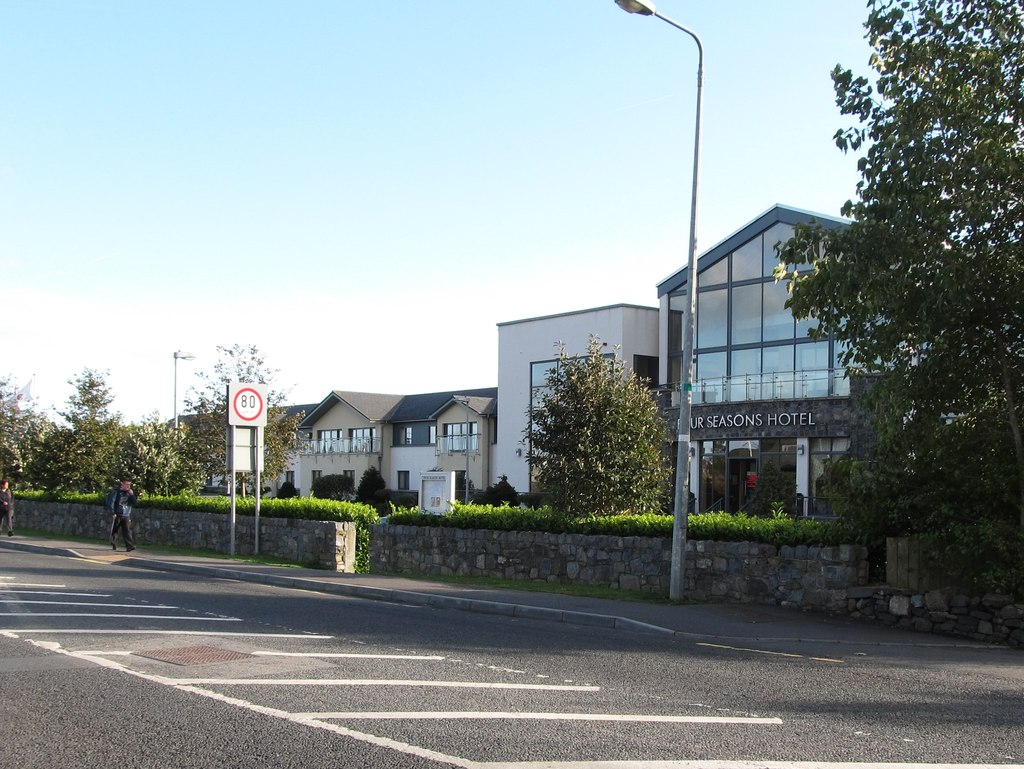
- Four Seasons Hotel, Carlingford, on the R176

Location
- Country: Ireland

Highway system
- Roads in Ireland; Motorways; Primary; Secondary; Regional

The R176 road is a regional road in Ireland, running its full length on the Cooley Peninsula in County Louth. It runs between its junction with R173 at Ghan Road, Carlingford and its junction with R175 at Saint James' Well via Carlingford Relief Road and Mullatee.

Its total length is 3 km (2 mi).

== See also ==
- Roads in Ireland
- National primary road
- National secondary road
