= Dromaneen Castle =

Ruined fortified house in County Cork, Ireland

- Caisleán an Dromainnín (Irish)
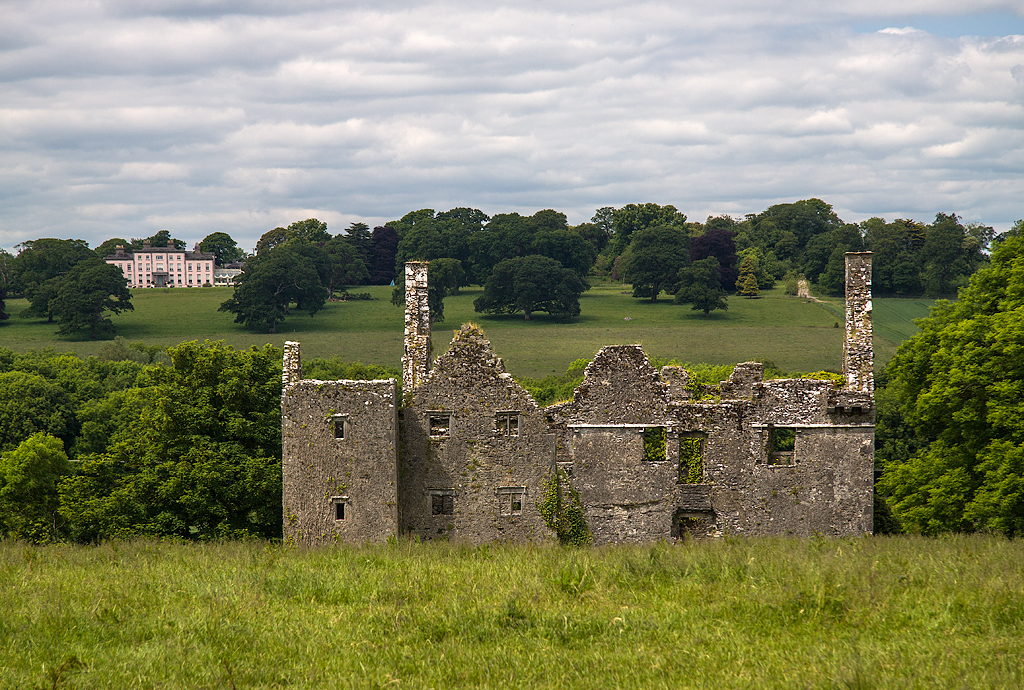

- Location within Ireland
- 52.128461°N 8.729877°W
- Type: Fortified house
- Location: Dromaneen, Mallow, County Cork, Ireland

History
- Built: c. 1610

Site notes
- Owner: State

National monument of Ireland
- Official name: Dromaneen Castle
- Reference no.: 339

Dromaneen Castle is a fortified house and National Monument located in County Cork, Ireland.

It was one of the three main castles of the ancient O’Callaghan clan. The ruin is that of a Jocobean mansion and it is said to have been built by Caher O’Callaghan in around 1610. It was built to replace an older fortification, which had probably been in the style of a tower house. It was here that the Papal Nuncio Rinunicci was entertained in 1642. The castle was destroyed in 1652 during the Irish Confederate Wars. No effort was made to defend it and it was apparently occupied by Sir Richard Herrill, and Tynte of Youghal after which it was passed to Sir Richard Kyrle.

== Location ==
Dromaneen Castle is located 5.3 km (3.3 mi) west of Mallow, on the south bank of the Munster Blackwater.
