= Locomotives of the Dundalk, Newry and Greenore Railway =

Dundalk, Newry and Greenore Railway 0-6-0ST
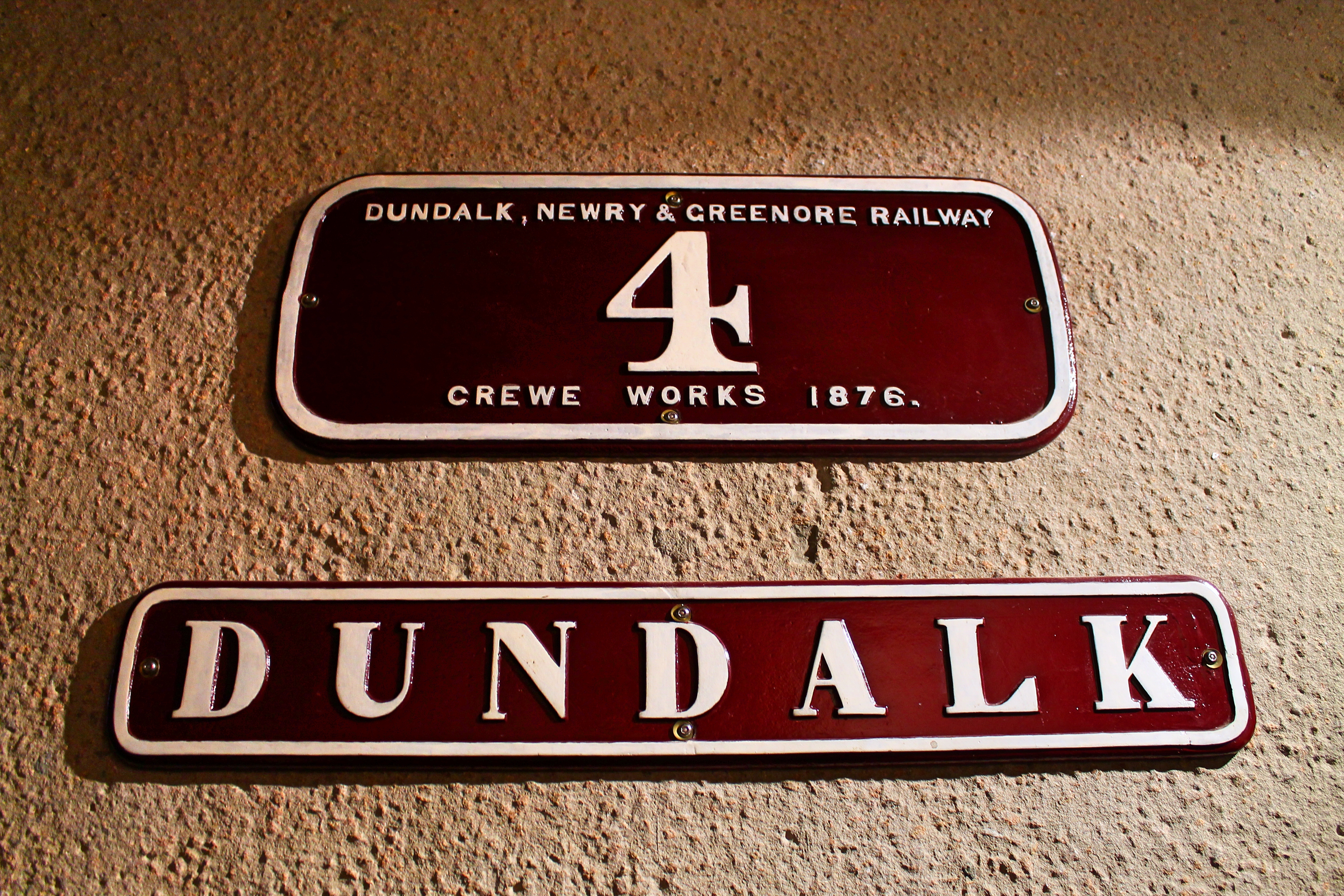
- Name and number plates from No. 4 Dundalk
Type and origin
- Power type: Steam
- Builder: Crewe Works
- Serial number: 1509–1511, 1962–1963, 3877
- Build date: 1873–1898
- Total produced: 6
Specifications
- Configuration
  - Whyte: 0-6-0ST
- Gauge: 1,600 mm (5 ft 3 in)
- Driver dia.: 5 ft 2 1/2 in (1,588 mm)
- Loco weight: 35 long tons 5 cwt (79,000 lb or 35.8 t)
- Boiler pressure: 140 lbf/in^{2} (0.97 MPa)
- Cylinder size: 17 in × 22 in (430 mm × 560 mm)
Performance figures
- Tractive effort: 13,200 lbf (59,000 N)
Career
- Operators: Dundalk, Newry and Greenore Railway
- Numbers: 1–6
- Withdrawn: 1929–1951
- Disposition: Scrapped

The locomotives of the Dundalk, Newry and Greenore Railway (DNGR) were six 0-6-0ST (saddle tanks), with inside cylinders. All were built at Crewe Works.

== History ==
The DNGR was owned by the London and North Western Railway (LNWR) and the locomotives were based on the LNWR Special Tanks, but built for Irish gauge and with larger driving wheels, 5 ft 2 1/2 in (1,588 mm) instead of 4 ft 5 1/2 in (1,359 mm). The locomotives were all built at the LNWR's Crewe Works, England. The first three were built in 1873, followed by another two in 1876 and a final locomotive in 1898. The sixth locomotive was not new, but was rebuilt from an LNWR DX Goods Class originally from 1867.

The locomotives were painted in LNWR livery. They were numbered in order of building from 1 to 6 and also carried names.

Number	Name	Works No.	Date built
1	Macrory	1509	1873
2	Greenore	1510	1873
3	Dundalk	1511	1873
4	Newry	1962	1876
5	Carlingford	1963	1876
6	Holyhead	3877	1898

In 1933 the Great Northern Railway (Ireland) (GNR) took over operation of the DNGR and began using its own locomotives for passenger trains, with the line's original locomotives remaining in use for goods services.

During World War II three of the remaining five locomotives (Nos. 1, 4 and 6) were loaned to the Northern Counties Committee and used for shunting duties around York Road, Belfast and in Coleraine, but all were returned by 1946 due to not being satisfactory to NCC's needs.

== Withdrawal ==
Locomotive No. 5 Carlingford was scrapped in 1929. Nos. 2 and 6 were out of use by 1948 and scrapped with Nos. 3 and 6 at Sutton, Dublin in 1952 after the DNGR closed. Consideration was given to the preservation of locomotive No. 1 Macrory but, in the end, no locomotives were preserved.
