= The Mint (Carlingford) =

Fortified house and National Monument, County Louth, Ireland

- An Mionta (Irish)
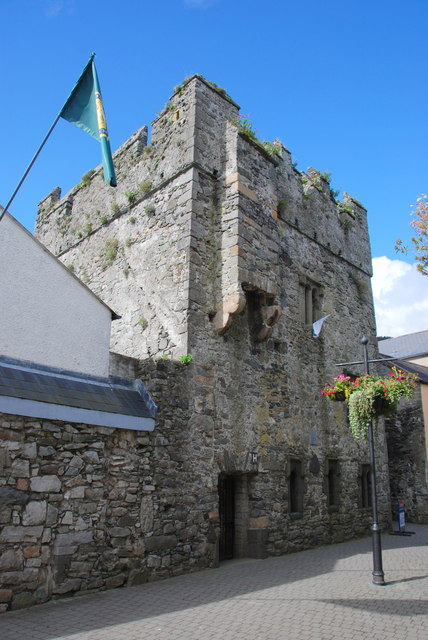

- Location within Ireland
- 54.040144°N 6.186272°W
- Type: Fortified house
- Location: Tholsel Street, Carlingford, County Louth, Ireland

History
- Built: 15th/16th century

Site notes
- Area: Cooley Peninsula
- Owner: State

National monument of Ireland
- Official name: The Mint
- Reference no.: 242

The Mint is a fortified house and National Monument located in Carlingford, County Louth, Ireland.

== Location ==
The Mint is located in the southern part of Carlingford, 120 m (390 ft) southwest of Carlingford Lough.

== History ==
This castle, variously called a fortified house or tower house, derived its name from the license to mint coins granted to Carlingford in 1467 by Edward IV. However, the present tower comes from later, either the 15th or 16th century. It is believed to have housed one of Carlingford's wealthy merchant families (perhaps the Marmions); however, the lack of a fireplace and the strength of the defences suggest that it may indeed have served as a mint. Against this is the fact that no coin minted at Carlingford has ever been found.

== Building ==
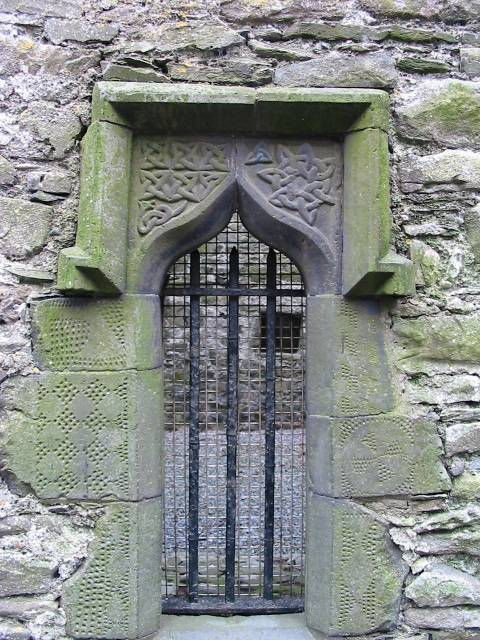
Ogee window

The Mint is three storeys high and made mainly of limestone. There is a battlemented chemin de ronde on the roof, with loopholes for muskets. A doorway is protected by machicolation.

The ground and first storey ogee windows (five in total) face onto the street, with carvings of a horse, a bust of a man, a bird, a snake and Celtic interlace ornament which reflects a revival of interest in Celtic art in the 15th–16th centuries. They also have hood mouldings and mullions.
