= Burncourt =

Burncourt An Chúirt Dóite
- Village
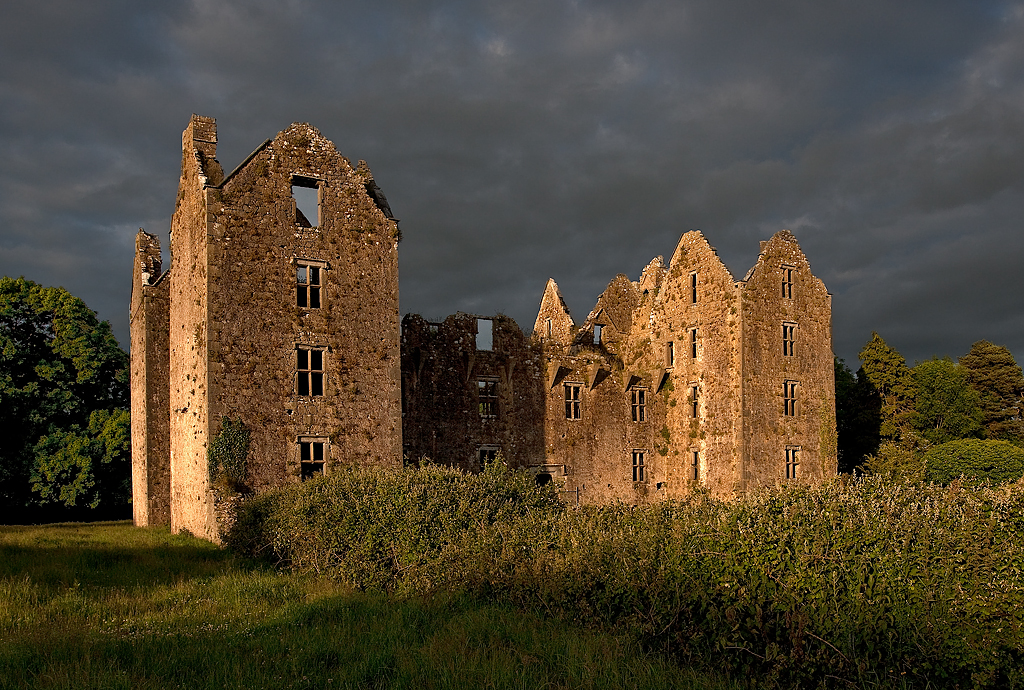
- Ruin of Burncourt Castle

- Location in Ireland
- Coordinates: 52°19′N 8°04′W
- Country: Ireland
- Province: Munster
- County: County Tipperary
- Time zone: UTC+0 (WET)
  - Summer (DST): UTC-1 (IST (WEST))

Burncourt (Irish: An Chúirt Dóite) is a village in County Tipperary, Ireland with an approximate population of 138 people.

== Location ==
It lies in the Galtee-Vee Valley with the Galtee Mountains to the north and the Knockmealdowns to the south. It is located 1.7 kilometres from the former main Dublin to Cork road now designated as the R639 regional road. The nearest large towns are Cahir and Mitchelstown, which are 16 kilometres and 15 kilometres respectively.

== History ==
The settlement gets its name from the castle situated 650 metres east of the village centre, it was burned to its shell during the Cromwellian conquest of Ireland in 1650, later becoming known as "Burnt Court".

The Mitchelstown Caves are situated approximately 2.5 kilometres from Burncourt and were discovered in 1833 by a labourer quarrying on a small farm.

The stately Shanbally Castle was situated 4 kilometres outside the village. Built c.1820 for the 1st Viscount Lismore and designed by the architect John Nash. It was completely demolished in 1960.
