= Fortified houses in Ireland =

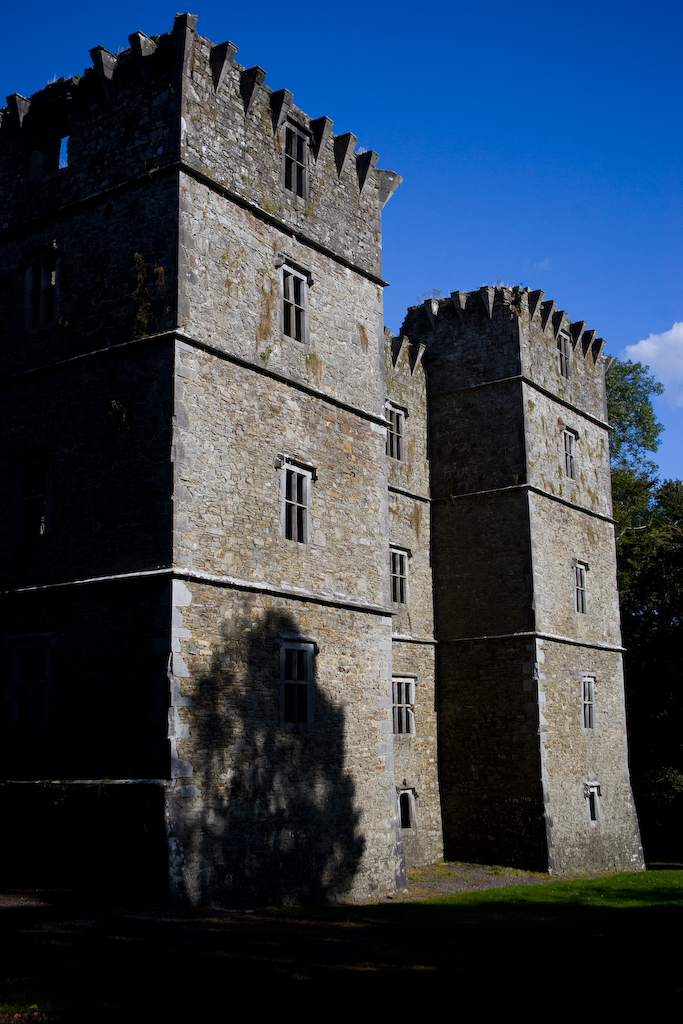
Kanturk Castle, Kanturk, County Cork

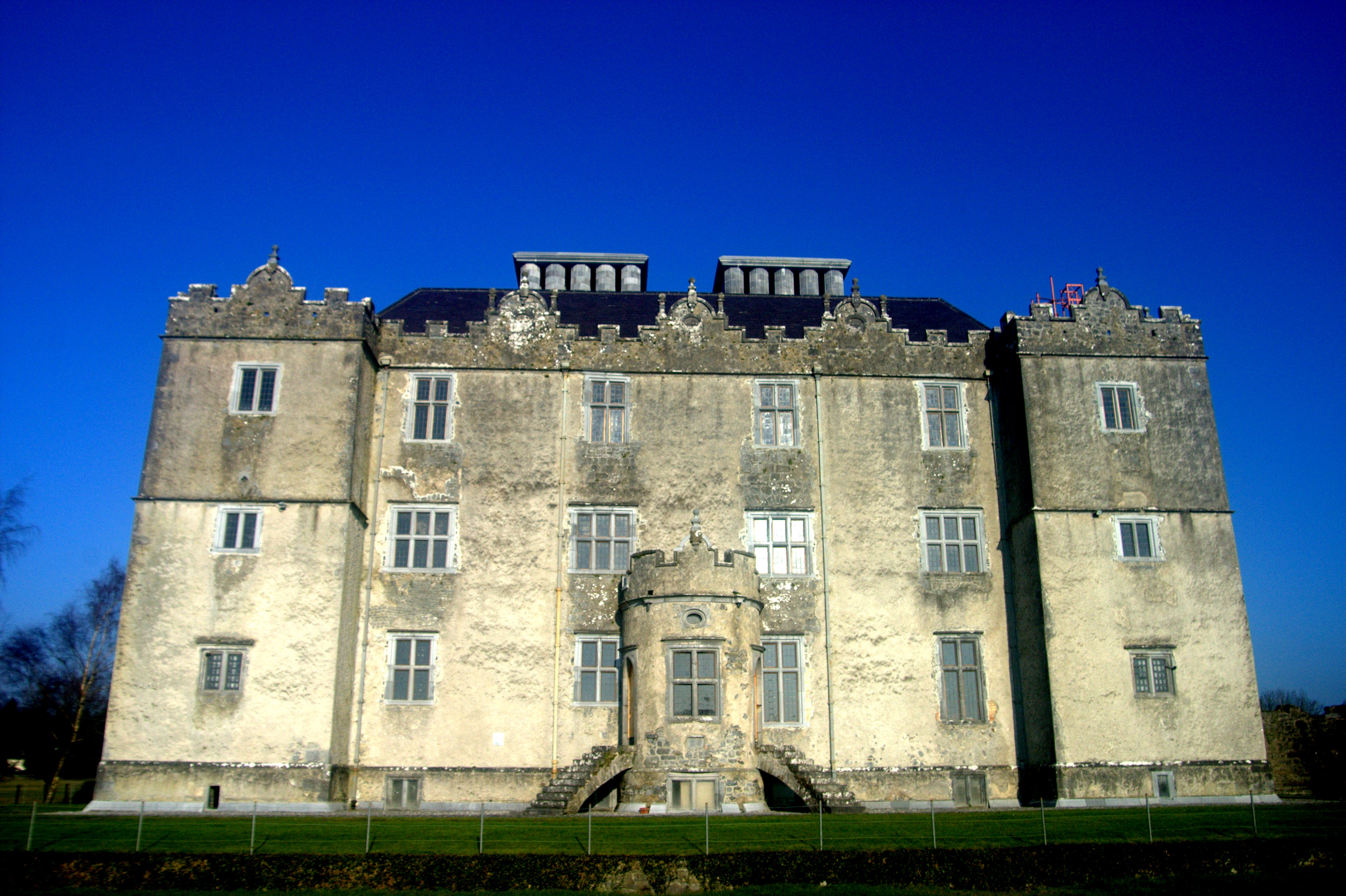
Portumna castle.

In Ireland at the end of the sixteenth and beginning of the seventeenth century, the fortified house (Irish: teach daingean), along with the stronghouse, developed as a replacement for the tower house. 'Fortified Houses' were often rectangular, or sometimes U or L-shaped, three-storey structures with high gables and chimney stacks and large windows with hood mouldings. Some examples have square towers at the corners. The interiors were relatively spacious with wooden partitions and numerous fireplaces. In a number of cases 'Fortified Houses' were built onto pre-existing tower houses. 'Fortified Houses' were protected by gun fire from the angle towers and bartizans, and were also provided with bawn walls with gunloops, towers and protected gateways. 'Fortified Houses' were built throughout Ireland by large landowners from a variety of backgrounds, such as the Old English Earl of Clanricarde who built Portumna Castle in County Galway; Gaelic lords such as MacDonogh MacCarthy, Lord of Duhallow, who built Kanturk Castle in County Cork; and Cromwellian soldiers such as Sir Charles Coote, who built Rush Hall in County Offaly.

Over the past six decades studies concerning Irish 'Fortified Houses' have identified them as a transitional genre that emerged at the end of the sixteenth century and acted as an architectural bridge between the Irish medieval tower-house and the country manor house of the late seventeenth century. The 'Fortified House' drew on the earlier tradition of the tower-house and was influenced by the Tudor and emerging Jacobean architecture from England and the Classical and Military architecture coming from Continental Europe. The social, political and military changes that took place from the 1580s-1650s were to play a major role in the development of this unique Irish structure. These houses provided a comfortable living space for the elite of early seventeenth-century Irish society. They were fashionable yet defendable. The 'Fortified House' was a public display of power and wealth. They represented a long term investment in their owner’s regional future and were monuments to an aspiration for an English and Continental house style suited to local Irish conditions. On a basic level the construction of a 'Fortified House' represented the owners’ desire to modernise and Anglicize.

== Examples ==
- Athlumney Castle, Navan
- Burncourt Castle, County Tipperary
- Coolhull Castle, County Wexford
- Dromaneen Castle, County Cork
- The Mint, Carlingford, County Louth
- Portumna Castle, County Galway
- Robertstown Castle, County Meath
- Saint David's Castle, Naas
- Terryglass Castle, County Tipperary
- Antrim Castle, County Antrim

== See also ==
- Tower house
- Manor house
