= King John's Castle (Carlingford) =

- Caisleán Chairlinn (Irish)
- Carlingford Castle
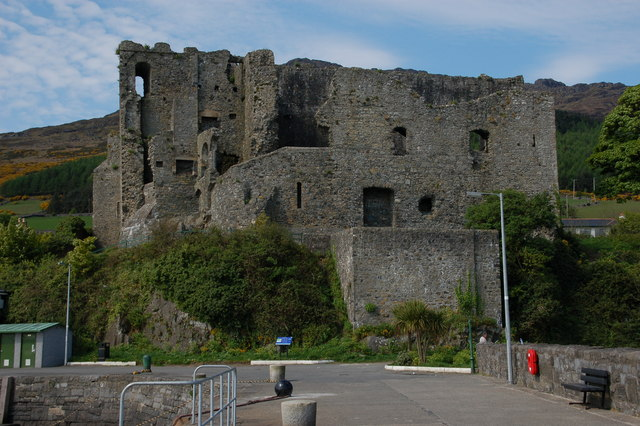

- Location within Ireland
- 54.043177°N 6.186830°W
- Type: enclosure castle
- Location: Carlingford, County Louth, Ireland

History
- Built: late 12th century

Site notes
- Area: Cooley Peninsula
- Owner: State

National monument of Ireland
- Official name: Carlingford Castle
- Reference no.: 249

King John's Castle, also known as Carlingford Castle, is an enclosure castle and National Monument located in Carlingford, County Louth, Ireland.

== Location ==
King John's Castle is located in Carlingford town's harbour, halfway along the south coast of Carlingford Lough.

== History ==
Carlingford Castle's west wing was built in the late 12th century by Hugh de Lacy, Lord of Meath shortly after the Norman invasion of Ireland. It acquired the name "King John's Castle" after King John, Lord of Ireland, supposedly stayed there for three days in 1210, during his second expedition, when he invaded Ulster to apprehend Hugh de Lacy, 1st Earl of Ulster. Local myth claims that he began to draft Magna Carta (agreed in 1215) at Carlingford. Other accounts associate its construction with Ralph Pepper in 1204.

The east wing of the castle was added c. 1261. In 1326 the castle was committed to Geoffrey le Blound. Edmond Loundres was constable in 1388, Stephen Gernon in 1400. Henry MacShane O'Neill attempted to take the castle in 1596.

During the Irish Confederate Wars, the castle was held by the Irish Catholic Confederation; then was taken by Sir Henry Tichborne, 3rd Baronet (Parliamentarian) in 1642, then by Murrough O'Brien, 1st Earl of Inchiquin in 1649 and Charles Coote, 1st Earl of Mountrath in 1650.

During the Williamite War it was fired on by Jacobites in 1689 and used as a Williamite hospital by Frederick Schomberg, 1st Duke of Schomberg prior to the Battle of the Boyne.

== Description ==
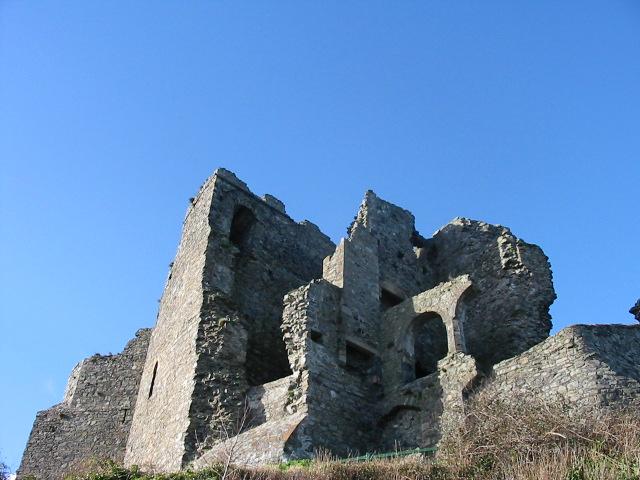
View of walls with arched window

King John's Castle is a D-shaped enclosure castle with walls 3.4 m (11 ft) thick. The curtain wall in the west wing had a gate house and a square flanking tower. The curtain wall also contains deep embrasures with narrow arrowslits.

A large rectangular hall is in the east wing: this hall had two main floors over a basement.
