= Hans Moore =

Irish recipient of the Victoria Cross (1834–1889)

Hans Moore VC CB
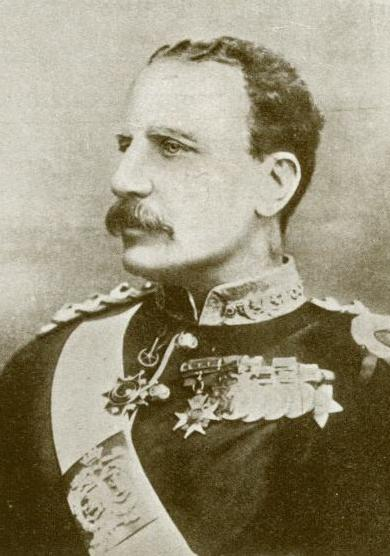
- Born: 31 March 1834; Carlingford, County Louth, Ireland, United Kingdom
- Died: 6 October 1889 (aged 55); Lough Derg, County Tipperary, Ireland, United Kingdom
- Burial place: Mount Jerome Cemetery, Dublin, Ireland
- Military career
- Allegiance: United Kingdom
- Branch: British Army
- Rank: Colonel
- Units: 88th Regiment (later The Connaught Rangers)
- Conflicts: Ninth Cape Frontier War
- Awards: Victoria Cross; Order of the Bath

Hans Garrett Moore VC CB (31 March 1834 – 6 October 1889), born in Carlingford, County Louth, Ireland, was an Irish recipient of the Victoria Cross, the highest and most prestigious award for gallantry in the face of the enemy that can be awarded to British and Commonwealth forces.

== Details ==
He was 43 years old, and a major in the 88th Regiment (later The Connaught Rangers), British Army during the Ninth Cape Frontier War when the following deed took place for which he was awarded the VC.

On 29 December 1877 near Komgha, South Africa, during an action with the Gaikas, Major Moore saw that a private of the Frontier Mounted Police was unable to mount his horse and was left at the mercy of the enemy. Realising the danger, Major Moore rode back alone in the midst of the enemy, and continued in his efforts to save the man's life until the latter was killed. The major shot two and received an assegai in the arm during this gallant attempt.

== Later life ==
He later achieved the rank of colonel. He died at Lough Derg, County Tipperary on 6 October 1889 whilst attempting to save a life and was buried at Mount Jerome Cemetery, Dublin, Ireland.

== The medal ==
The medal is on display in the MuseuMAfricA, Johannesburg, South Africa.
