= Saint David's Castle =

Norman building in Naas, County Kildare, Ireland

- Caisleán Naomh Dáithí (Irish)
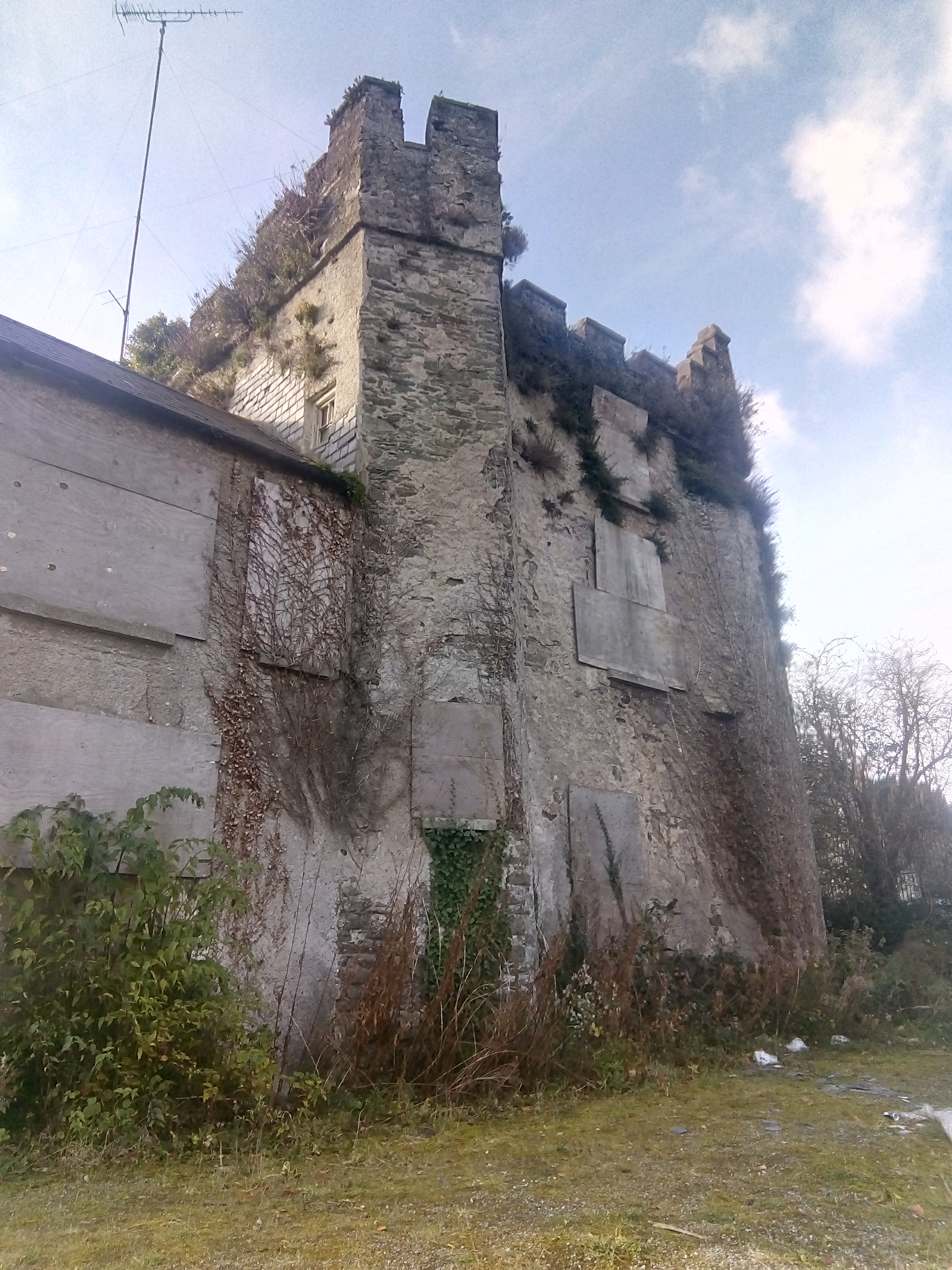
- View of castle from the east; its poor state of repair and boarded-up windows are evident.

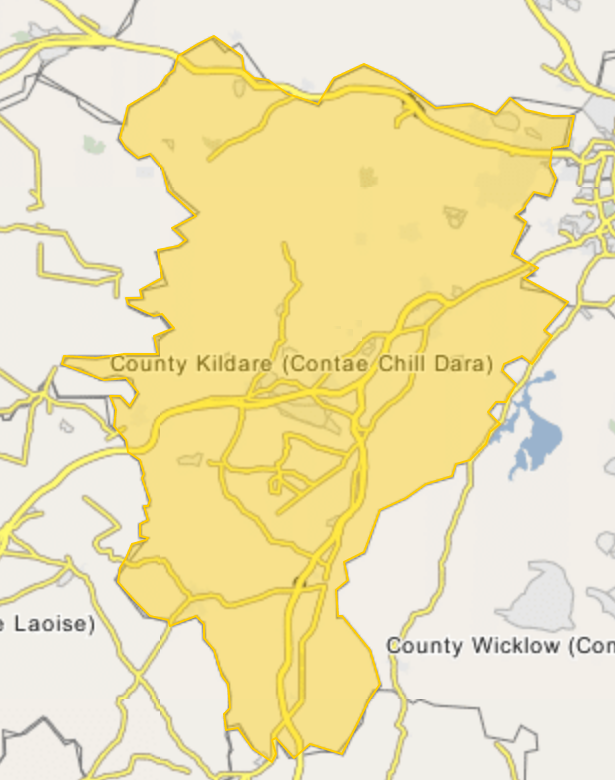
- Location within County Kildare
- 53°13′05″N 6°39′43″W
- Type: Fortified house
- Location: Church Lane, Naas, County Kildare, Ireland

History
- Built: 1210

Site notes
- Height: 12 m (39 ft)

Saint David's Castle is a 13th-century Norman castle located in Naas, Ireland.

== Location ==
Saint David's Castle is located just off Church Lane, immediately east of St David's Church.

== History ==
St. David’s Castle, sometimes called King John’s Castle, dates from the early Hiberno-Norman era, perhaps as early as 1200. John visited Naas in 1206. He visited again in 1210, when he held a form of Parliament in the town. About this time County Kildare became a separate county.

The name derives from Saint David, patron saint of Wales, as the Normans who settled Naas were mostly Welsh in origin.

In 1409 Henry IV, Lord of Ireland granted to Naas its first charter as a Corporation and a few years later it was given power to collect tolls at all the entrances to the town, the moneys to go towards fortifying the town with walls and gates.

Saint David's Castle was rebuilt and incorporated into the town wall structure at this time.

It was converted into a dwelling in the 18th century. The Church of Ireland rector occupied the house by the 18th century.

It was the residence of Dr. Jack Stanley Gibson, who pioneered the use of hypnosis in surgery, from 1972 until his death in 2008.

== Building ==
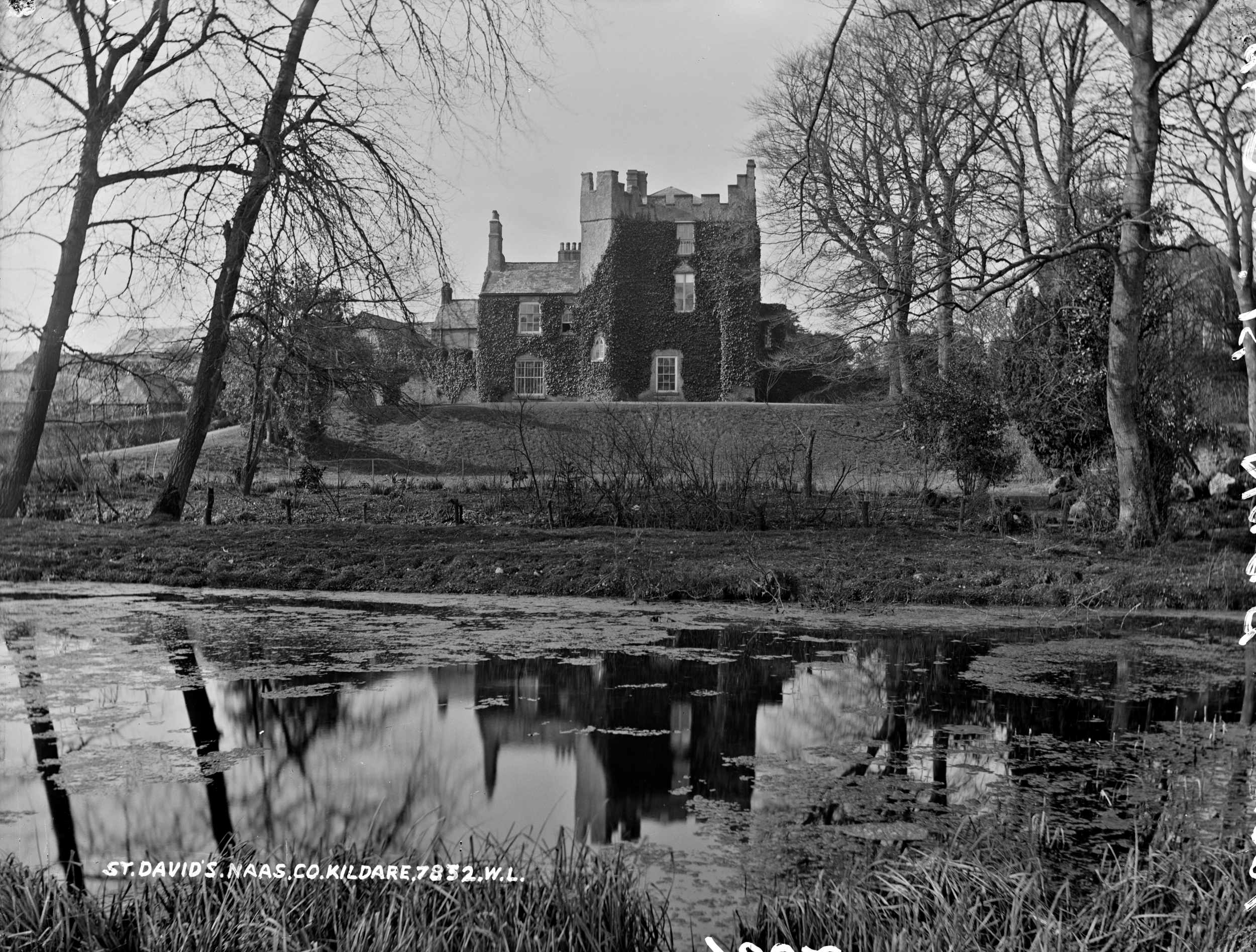
Saint David's Castle in the 19th century. The image shows a pool (filled by a mill race) that once stood to the northeast of the castle; it has since been filled in.

It is a large building of three storeys, comprising a tower with a winding stone staircase. It has a large entrance hall, two reception rooms, a kitchen, six bedrooms, three bathrooms, two tower rooms, and an annexe with four additional rooms.

It is on an irregular plan incorporating the fabric of the tower house, comprising three-bay two-storey range, with single-bay two-storey projecting bay to front (southeast) on an L-shaped plan, having a two-bay single-storey bay with half dormer attic at angles to northeast.
