= Rathumney Castle =

- Caisleán Ráth Omna[í] (Irish)
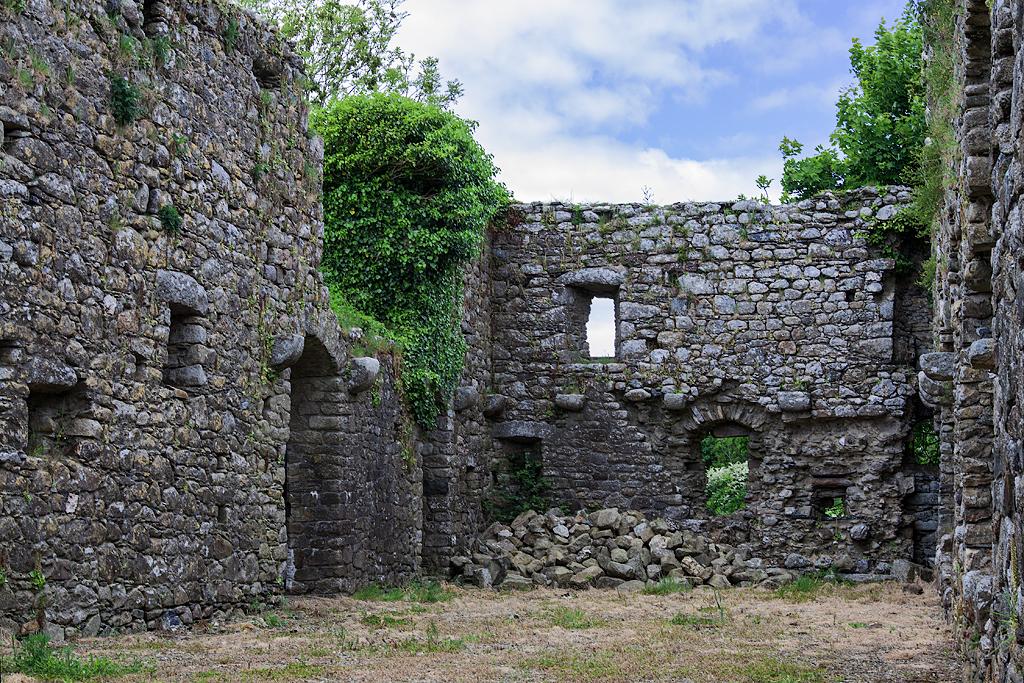
- Interior view

- Location within Ireland
- 52.295312°N 6.874471°W
- Type: hall house
- Location: Rathumney, Campile, County Wexford, Ireland

History
- Built: early 13th century

Site notes
- Height: 20 m (66 ft)
- Area: Barrow Valley
- Owner: State

National monument of Ireland
- Official name: Rathumney Castle
- Reference no.: 229

Rathumney Castle is a hall house and National Monument located in County Wexford, Ireland.

== Location ==
Rathumney Castle is located in southern County Wexford, 4.6 km (2.9 mi) east of Campile.

== History ==
Rathumney "Castle" is more correctly a hall house, and is believed to have been built by the Prendergasts (descendants of Maurice de Prendergast) in the early 13th century. It served as a Cistercian grange house for nearby Tintern Abbey. The Barry family leased the grange in the 14th–15th centuries; this was common at the time, as the Cistercians had fewer lay brothers and the granges were free of tithes.

After the Cromwellian confiscation Rathumney became untenanted. Later owners were the Alcock, Colclough, Prendergast families and the current owners of the land are Foleys. They claim that King James II stayed at Rathumney on 2 July 1690 on his way to Duncannon, whence he departed to France, never to return.

== Building ==
The centre of the building was a two-storey hall, with fireplaces, tall windows and doorways. The ground floor had kitchens, servants' quarters and storerooms, while the upper floor was for the noble family. The house was built of granite, shale and conglomerate. All the interior walls and worked stone have been removed. The overall floor area is measured 146.1 m^{2} (1,573 sq ft). at The house is surrounded by a bawn and a tower in the southeast corner had stairs and a garderobe.
