= Coolhull Castle =

- Caisleán Chúil Choll (Irish)
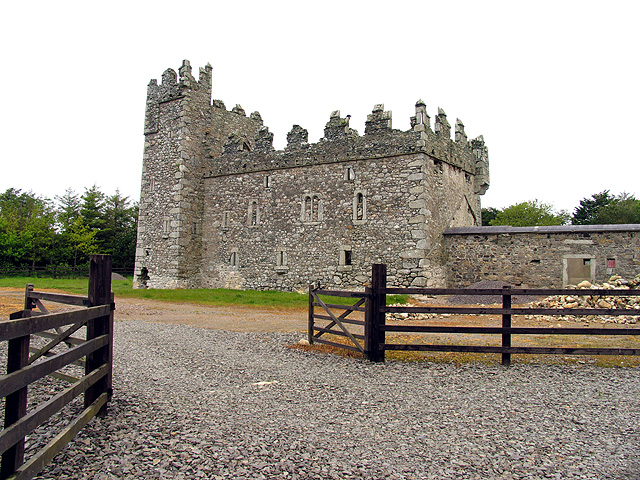

- Location within Ireland
- 52.234215°N 6.704587°W
- Type: Fortified house
- Location: Coolhull, Bannow, County Wexford, Ireland

History
- Built: late 16th century

Site notes
- Area: Bargy
- Owner: State

National monument of Ireland
- Official name: Coolhull Castle
- Reference no.: 644

Coolhull Castle is a late 16th century fortified house and National Monument located in County Wexford, Ireland.

== Location ==
Coolhull Castle is located in south County Wexford near Bannow Bay, 4.6 km (2.9 mi) southeast of Wellingtonbridge.

== History ==
There are no historical references to Coolhull Castle although it is known that a John Devereux owned land at Coolhull in 1640.

== Building ==
Coolhull Castle has a four-storey service tower and three-storey rectangular block (hall house) attached with a hall at first-floor level. Both sections have Irish crenellations. There is a bartizan in the northeast. The tower doorway is protected by a murder-hole. Other features include fireplaces, garderobe and slop stone.
