= Clone Church =

- Séipéal Chluana
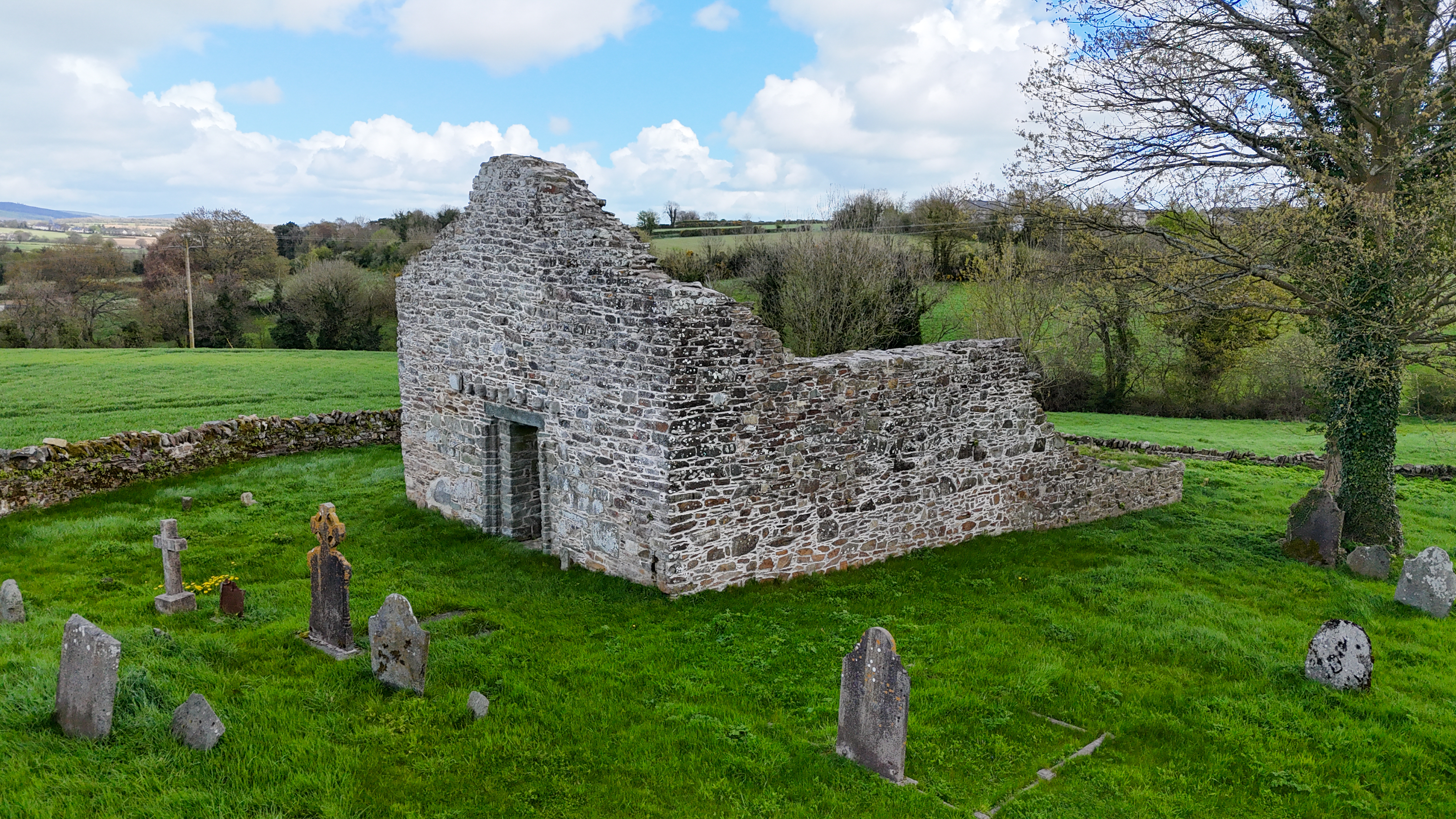
- Clone Church in 2026

- Location within Ireland
- 52.568347°N 6.504963°W
- Location: Clone, Ferns, County Wexford
- Country: Ireland
- Denomination: Church of Ireland
- Previous denomination: Pre-Reformation Catholic

History
- Dedication: Máedóc of Ferns

Architecture
- Functional status: inactive
- Style: Romanesque
- Years built: 13th century

Specifications
- Length: 16.95 m (55.6 ft)
- Width: 8.3 m (27 ft)
- Height: 1.5 m (4 ft 11 in)
- Materials: stone

Administration
- Diocese: Ferns

National monument of Ireland
- Official name: Clone Church
- Reference no.: 665

Clone Church is a Romanesque medieval church and National Monument in County Wexford, Ireland.

== Location ==
Clone Church is located 2.6 km (1.6 mi) south of Ferns, on the south side of the River Bann.

== History ==
Clone Church is built on the site of an earlier monastic foundation by Máedóc of Ferns (Aidan, Mogue). It was built in the 13th century in Romanesque style. The sundial was moved to Tintern Abbey in 2001.

A Romanesque window probably from this church was incorporated into St. Peter's, the Church of Ireland parish church of Ferns. Face corbels from the church were incorporated into the wellhouse built over St Mogue's Well.

== Church ==
The church ruins consist of the west gable and part of the south wall. The west door jambs have chevron carvings on the architrave moulding.

Five carved heads, a greyhound and a stone with dog-tooth decoration are over the door.

=== Graveyard ===
The graveyard contains two cross slabs and two bullaun stones.

A stone sundial (c. 1200) was formerly in the graveyard of Clone Church, a remnant of the old monastery where a clock was needed so that the Liturgy of the Hours could be recited at the correct times. There are twelve hour-lines and a hole for the gnomon, and another hole above it of unknown purpose.
