= Carlingford, County Louth =

Town on the Cooley Peninsula, County Louth, Ireland

Carlingford Cairlinn
- Town
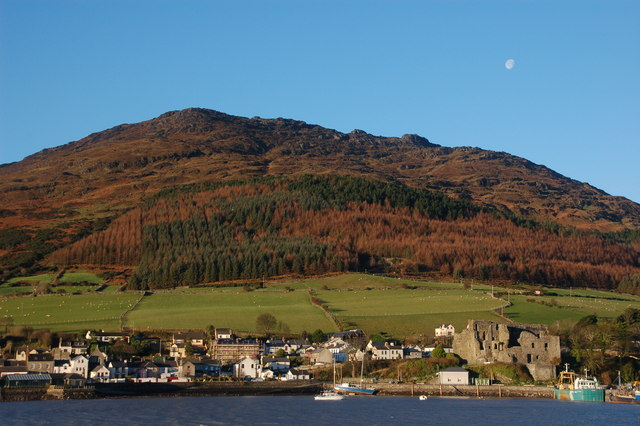
- Carlingford below Slieve Foy

- Location in Ireland
- Coordinates: 54.04294°N 6.18609°W
- Country: Ireland
- Province: Leinster
- County: County Louth
- Barony: Dundalk Lower
- Elevation: 1 m (3.3 ft)

Population (2016)
  - Urban: 1,445
- Time zone: UTC±0 (WET)
  - Summer (DST): UTC+1 (IST)
- Eircode routing key: A91
- Telephone area code: +353(0)42
- Irish Grid Reference: J185115

Carlingford (from Old Norse Kerlingfjǫrðr 'narrow sea-inlet of the hag'; Irish: Cairlinn) is a coastal town and civil parish in northern County Louth, Ireland. For the purposes of local government, the town is part of the Dundalk Municipal District. It is situated on the southern shore of Carlingford Lough with Slieve Foy mountain as a backdrop, sometimes known as Carlingford Mountain. It is the main town on the Cooley Peninsula. Located on the R176/R173 roads between Greenore and Omeath village, Carlingford is approximately 27 km (17 mi) north east (by road) from Dundalk (15.6 km; 9¾ miles directly), 90 km (56 mi) north of Dublin and 11 km (7 mi) south of the border (by road) with County Armagh in Northern Ireland. Carlingford won the Irish Tidy Towns Competition in 1988. The town lies within the Barony of Dundalk Lower.

Carlingford still retains its medieval layout, which is noticeable by the narrow lanes and small streets. Tholsel Street is where the last of the medieval walled town's gates can still be seen, called "The Tholsel", which apparently was also used as a gaol. On Tholsel Street itself there is still a 16th-century Town House known as the Carlingford Mint.

== History ==
=== Foundation ===
The original Irish name for the Gaelic settlement where Carlingford is now located was Dún Ogalla. The Vikings invaded Ireland in the 9th Century and historical records tell that they occupied Carlingford Lough, a naturally secure bay. Carlingford was inhabited in the 12th century by Norman knight Hugh de Lacy after laying the foundation stone for a castle on a strategic outcrop of rock. A settlement sprang up close to this fortress. The castle is known by the name of King John's Castle following a visit in the year 1210. The castle is an extensive ruin seated on a solid rock - the sides of which are enclosed by the sea. Mountains rise on the inland side, at the foot of which is a narrow pass which was formerly commanded by the fortress.

=== Prosperous years ===
Carlingford's strategic position on the east coast of Ireland (along with Carrickfergus and Drogheda) made it an important trading port. This trade led to its relative prosperity during the 14th, 15th and early 16th centuries. Carlingford's early prosperity faltered when, in 1388, the town was burnt to the ground, by a Scots force under the command of Sir William Douglas of Nithsdale. This was a punitive raid, following Irish attacks on Galloway, the Lord of which was Nithsdale's father, Archibald the Grim. As a result of this and similar raids, the town in 1410 obtained a remission from payment of tallage, an arbitrary tax levied on towns.

Carlingford received five charters in total; the first in 1326 by Edward II and the last in 1619 under James I. The increased trade encouraged a mercantile class to build in the area, the results of which can be seen today in the remains of the Mint and Taffe's Castle.

Carlingford was regarded for its green-finned oysters, which remained its main employment source, alongside herring fishing. The oysters were renowned throughout Britain and Europe while also gaining responses when mentioned in related texts.

=== War and ruin ===
The 1641 Rising by the Irish of Ulster, the Cromwellian Conquest of 1649, and the subsequent Williamite wars of the 1690s all took their toll on the local economy. As recorded in the Journal of Isaac Butler, Carlingford the town was in a "state of ruin" by 1744. However, the final nail in the coffin was the desertion to open water of the prosperous herring shoals that occupied the lough by the early 18th century.

=== Modern era ===
Carlingford's inability to develop a heavy industry allowed its mediaeval layout and archaeological artefacts to remain relatively intact. The area was opened up to tourism in the 1870s by the Dundalk, Newry and Greenore railway, which passed through Carlingford. This line closed in 1951. These transport links led to tourism being a key source of employment. Fishing was also important economically; particularly oysters and crabs from the nearby harbour. The town hosts the annual Carlingford Oyster Festival usually held in August. A passenger ferry operates daily out of the village of Greenore, 5 km (3.1 mi) away, during the summer months.

On the day of the 1918 general election, the Camlough Company of the Irish Volunteers travelled by train from Newry to Carlingford. On arrival, they found large numbers of Carlingford inhabitants wearing Union Jacks. The Volunteers ordered all the Royal Irish Constabulary (RIC) men they saw on duty on the streets or at the polling booths to return to their barracks and to remain in them whilst the Volunteers were in Carlingford. A series of attacks were made on the Volunteers by mobs on the streets. The Volunteers took control and sought to protect voters going to record their votes until the polling booths closed. Seamus Lyang from Dundalk was polling clerk in Carlingford and when the booths closed the Volunteers had to take Lyang under their protection and escort him out of the Carlingford. All the pubs and shops in Carlingford were hostile to the Volunteers and refused to serve them. After the closing of the poll, the Volunteers marched back to Camlough.

=== Cultural references ===
The Irish singer-songwriter Tommy Makem wrote a melancholy song about the town, "Farewell to Carlingford", covered by The Clancy Brothers and Tommy Makem and The Dubliners. In the Dublin Penny Journal, they advised that in AD 432 St Patrick's second landing in Ireland was, according to some authorities, effected here.

== Places of interest ==
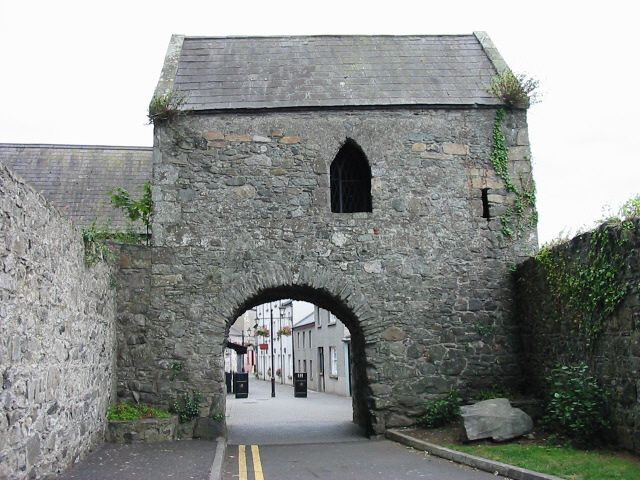
The Tholsel

- King John's Castle. Despite the western part being commissioned by Hugh de Lacy before 1186, the castle owes its name to King John (Richard the Lionheart's brother), who visited Carlingford in 1210. The eastern part was constructed in the mid-13th century with alterations and additions occurring in the 15th and 16th centuries. In the 1950s the Office of Public Works (OPW) undertook conservation work to stabilise the structure. A view of the north pier and lough can be had from the viewing area on the eastern side of the castle, though the castle itself is closed to the general public for safety reasons.
- Taaffe's Castle / Merchant House. A fortified townhouse that according to local tradition belonged to the rich mercantile Taaffe family who became Earls of Carlingford in 1661. However, there is no evidence to suggest that it was built or in fact owned by the Taaffes. Early topographical maps provide evidence that it was in existence before the Taaffe family were provided with their Earl of Carlingford title, The Taaffes mainly resided in Sligo. The castle's close proximity to the harbour would suggest a trading depot on the ground floor with the upper floors reserved for residence. The construction suggests two phases—the main tower was built in the early 16th century while the extension to the side occurred later.
- The Tholsel. The Tholsel or "town-gate" is the only remaining example of its nature in Carlingford and one of the few left in Ireland. Originally it was three stories high—the present appearance due to alterations made in the 19th century. The original function was to levy taxes on goods entering the town—the murder-holes on the side of the walls are testaments to that fact. In 1834 it was used by the Corporation of Carlingford for meeting and a Parliament is said to have used it to make laws for "The Pale". It was also used as a town jail in the 18th century.
- The Mint. A fortified three-storey townhouse belonging to a wealthy merchant family in the centre of Carlingford. While the right to mint coinage was not granted to Carlingford until 1467, it is unlikely that it was actually used as a mint. Its features include five highly decorated limestone windows. The patterns and motifs are an example of the influence of the Celtic Renaissance on art during the 16th century.
- Dominican Friary. The Dominican Order was established in Carlingford in 1305 primarily because of their patron Richard Óg de Burgh, 2nd Earl of Ulster, with the friary itself being dedicated to St. Malachy. Dissolved in 1540 by Henry VIII, it became the centre of a repossession struggle between the Dominicans and Franciscans in the 1670s. It was resolved in favour of the Dominicans by Oliver Plunkett. However, the friary itself was subsequently abandoned in the 18th century by the Dominicans to their present location of Dundalk. The remains today consist of a nave and chancel divided by a tower. Also, there are possible remains of some domestic buildings to the south like a mill, mill race and mill pond.
- Town Wall. Established by charter in 1326 by Edward II to the Bailiffs of Carlingford it allowed them to levy murage for its building. Not much remains however but the little that does has some externally splayed musket loops that would indicate the arrival of firearms to Ireland in the late 15th century. It is likely that the wall had an external ditch to strengthen its defences. Its purpose was to serve as a barrier to ensure that goods entering the town had to pass through a town gate (and hence could be taxed) but it also had the purpose of creating a boundary between Gael and Norman.
- Ghan House. A Georgian House built by William Stannus in 1727 it is surrounded by castellated walls and a guard tower. The first floor contains the drawing room which has a decorative ceiling of rococo plasterwork of flower garlands and medallion busts reputed to be of Stannus ladies. The basement contains two underground passageways (now blocked) that led to the Heritage Centre and the bakers (now chemist). The latter tunnel was reportedly used by a silent order of monks who once lived on the site and apparently supplied the local bakery but wished to avoid contact with townspeople. Today Ghan House is used as a guest house (with a wine bar), ballroom, meeting room and cookery school.
- Church of the Holy Trinity. Donated by the Church of Ireland to Carlingford this restored medieval church is also known as the Holy Trinity Heritage Centre. Exhibits inside display the history of Carlingford from Viking times to the present period. Musical recitals are common. The grounds outside contain a graveyard.
- Market Square. Now the main street of Carlingford, this was the area where a weekly market was held with records of its layout going back to 1358. It is now the intersection of Dundalk Street and the beginning of River Lane.

== Transport ==
Carlingford railway station opened on 1 August 1876, but finally closed on 1 January 1952 when the Dundalk, Newry & Greenore Railway ceased operations. In 1948 the film Saints and Sinners used various locations around Carlingford including a scene at the beginning at the station of a DN&GR train arriving.

Bus Éireann route 161 operates Monday to Saturday, providing seven journeys to Dundalk via Greenore and four journeys to Newry via Omeath. This service does not operate on Sundays or Bank Holidays.

On Sundays, Local Link Louth Meath Fingal route 701, operated by Halpenny Travel, provides three journeys to Dundalk, and three journeys to Newry via Omeath.

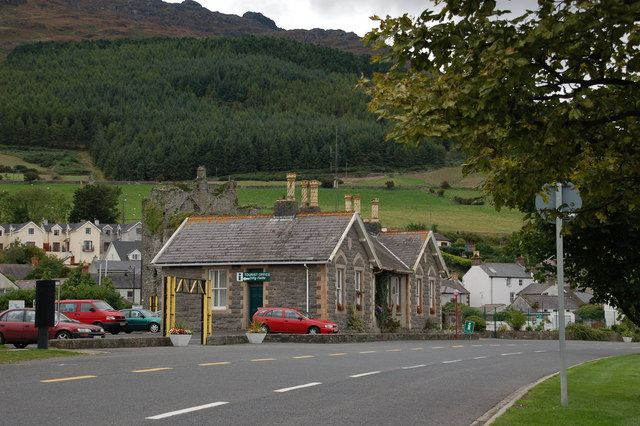
Former railway station on the Dundalk, Newry and Greenore Railway.

Carlingford also has a marina.

== In popular culture ==
The 2021 film Finding You is set and shot in Carlingford.

The 2024 film Fréwaka was shot in Carlingford.

== Notable people ==
- Terry Brennan (born 24 May 1942) is a Fine Gael politician who was formerly a senator.
- Thomas D'Arcy McGee (13 April 1825, Carlingford - 7 April 1868, Ottawa, Ontario, Canada) was the first Canadian politician to be assassinated, reportedly by a Fenian. A formerly radical politician, McGee became a moderate and urged Irish Catholics to address grievances via parliamentary rather than physical force methods.
- Peter Boyle (26 Apr 1876, Carlingford - 24 Jun 1939, Doncaster, in Yorkshire, England) was a footballer. Capped five times for Ireland, and played for FA Cup Winners Sheffield United in 1899 and 1902.
- Arthur Moore, recipient of the Victoria Cross
- Hans Moore (1834–89), British Army Major who received the Victoria Cross during the Cape Frontier Wars
- Rev. Lorcán Ó Muireadais (1883–1941) was a Catholic priest and Irish language activist.
- Daniel Joseph Anthony "Tony" Meehan (2 March 1943 – 28 November 2005) was a London-born and raised musician and founder member of The Shadows, along with Jet Harris, Hank B. Marvin and Bruce Welch; he played the drums on all the early Cliff Richard and The Shadows hits, and is buried in Carlingford cemetery.

== See also ==
- List of abbeys and priories in Ireland (County Louth)
- List of towns and villages in Ireland
