= Dundalk, Newry and Greenore Railway =

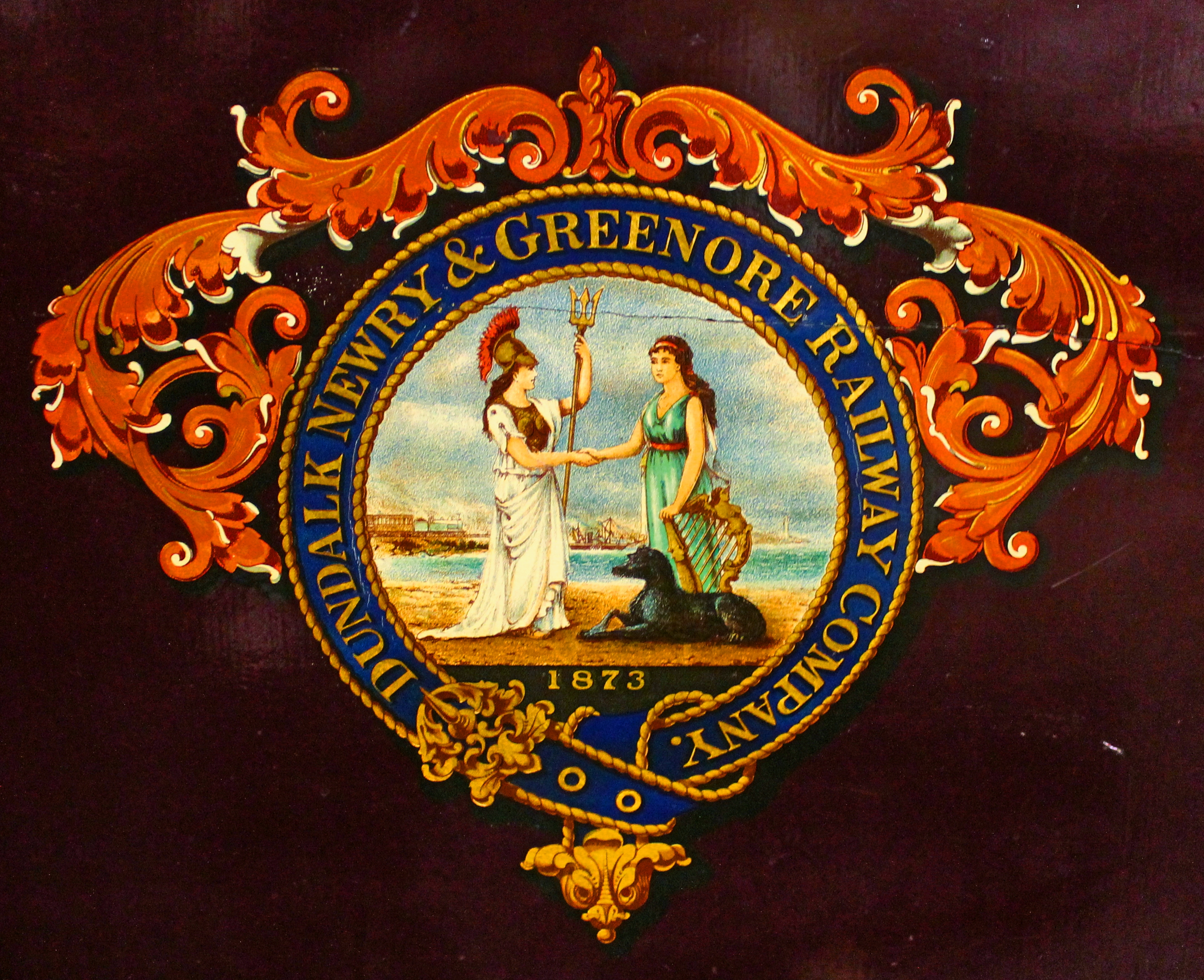

Overview
- Dates of operation: 1873–1951

Technical
- Track gauge: 5 ft 3 in (1,600 mm)

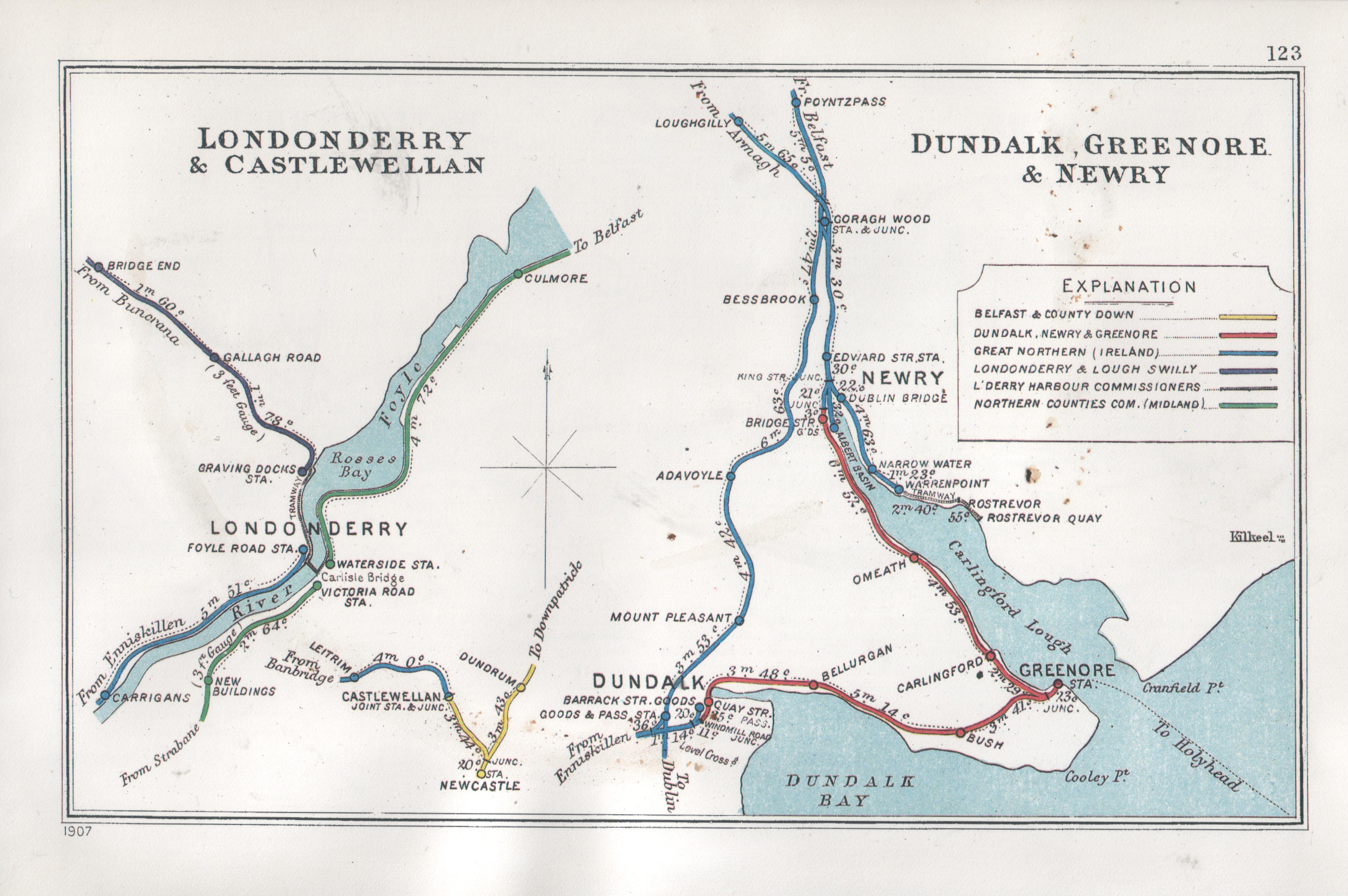

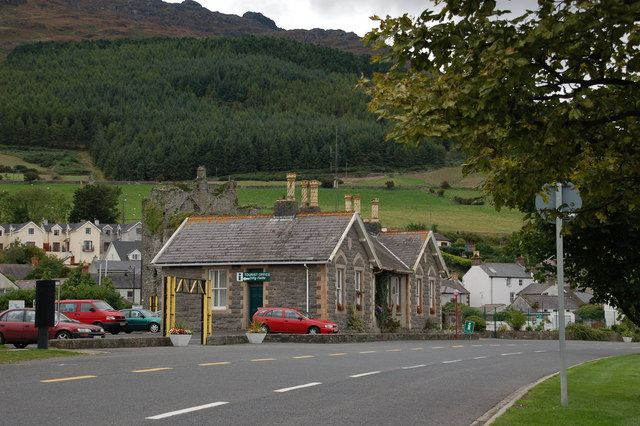
Former railway station at Carlingford, County Louth. This is now the Cooley Peninsula Tourist Office

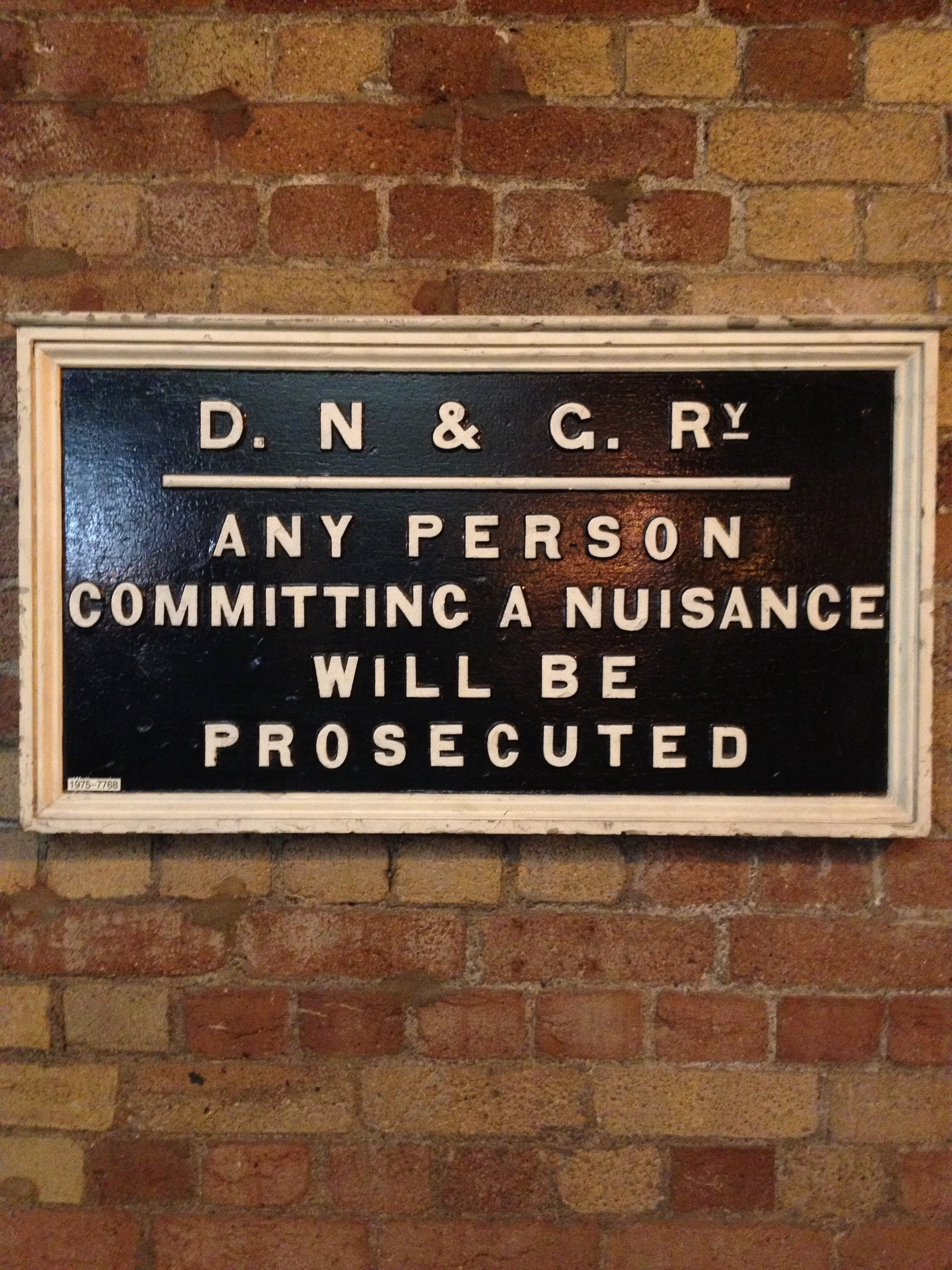
Dundalk, Newry and Greenore Railway sign at the National Railway Museum, York

The 26 miles (42 km) Dundalk, Newry and Greenore Railway (DNGR, DN&GR) was an Irish gauge (1,600 mm (5 ft 3 in)) railway in Ireland. It was conceived as the Dundalk and Greenore Railway in the 1860s to provide a link between the towns in its title and the London and North Western Railway port at Greenore, from where a ferry service operated to Holyhead. It was opened between Greenore and Dundalk in 1873 and extended to Newry in 1876. The company operated a hotel at Greenore.

== Ownership ==
Dundalk and Greenore Railway Act 1863
- Act of Parliament
- Parliament of the United Kingdom
- Long title: An Act for making a Railway from the Irish North-western Railway at Dundalk to Greenore in the County of Louth; and for other Purposes.
- Citation: 26 & 27 Vict. c. ccxxxiii

Dates
- Royal assent: 28 July 1863

Text of statute as originally enacted

Dundalk and Greenore Railway Act 1867
- Act of Parliament
- Parliament of the United Kingdom
- Long title: An Act to extend the Time for the Completion of the Railway of the Dundalk and Greenore Railway Company; to enable that Company to construct new Railways at Dundalk, and to complete the joint Works authorized by "The Newry and Greenore Railway Act, 1863;" and for other Purposes.
- Citation: 30 & 31 Vict. c. clxxxiii

Dates
- Royal assent: 12 August 1867

Text of statute as originally enacted

Dundalk and Greenore Railway Act 1869
- Act of Parliament
- Parliament of the United Kingdom
- Long title: An Act to give further time for the completion of the Railways of the Dundalk and Greenore Railway Company and the joint works authorized by the Newry and Greenore Railway Act, 1863; and for other purposes.
- Citation: 32 & 33 Vict. c. cxxxii

Dates
- Royal assent: 26 July 1869

Text of statute as originally enacted

Dundalk, Newry, and Greenore Railway Act 1873
- Act of Parliament
- Parliament of the United Kingdom
- Long title: An Act to change the name of the Dundalk and Greenore Railway Company, and to enable them to make a railway from Newry to Greenore, and to acquire the undertaking of the Newry and Greenore Railway Company; and for other purposes.
- Citation: 36 & 37 Vict. c. clxxiv

Dates
- Royal assent: 21 July 1873

Text of statute as originally enacted

The London and North Western Railway owned the railway and at first provided its locomotives and rolling stock, with the locomotives coming from its Crewe Works. The railway passed to the London, Midland and Scottish Railway in 1923 but an agreement was reached in 1933 for the line to be worked by the Great Northern Railway. Because the partition of Ireland placed an international frontier across the DN&G's Greenore – Newry line, it was not absorbed into either the Great Southern Railways in 1925 or the Ulster Transport Authority in 1948.

== Closure ==
The line was closed on 31 December 1951 and the company was dissolved in 1957 by section 72 of the British Transport Commission Act 1957 (5 & 6 Eliz. 2. c. xxxiii). In recent years, much of the line has been restored as part of the Carlingford to Omeath Greenway between Newry and Carlingford.

== Preservation ==
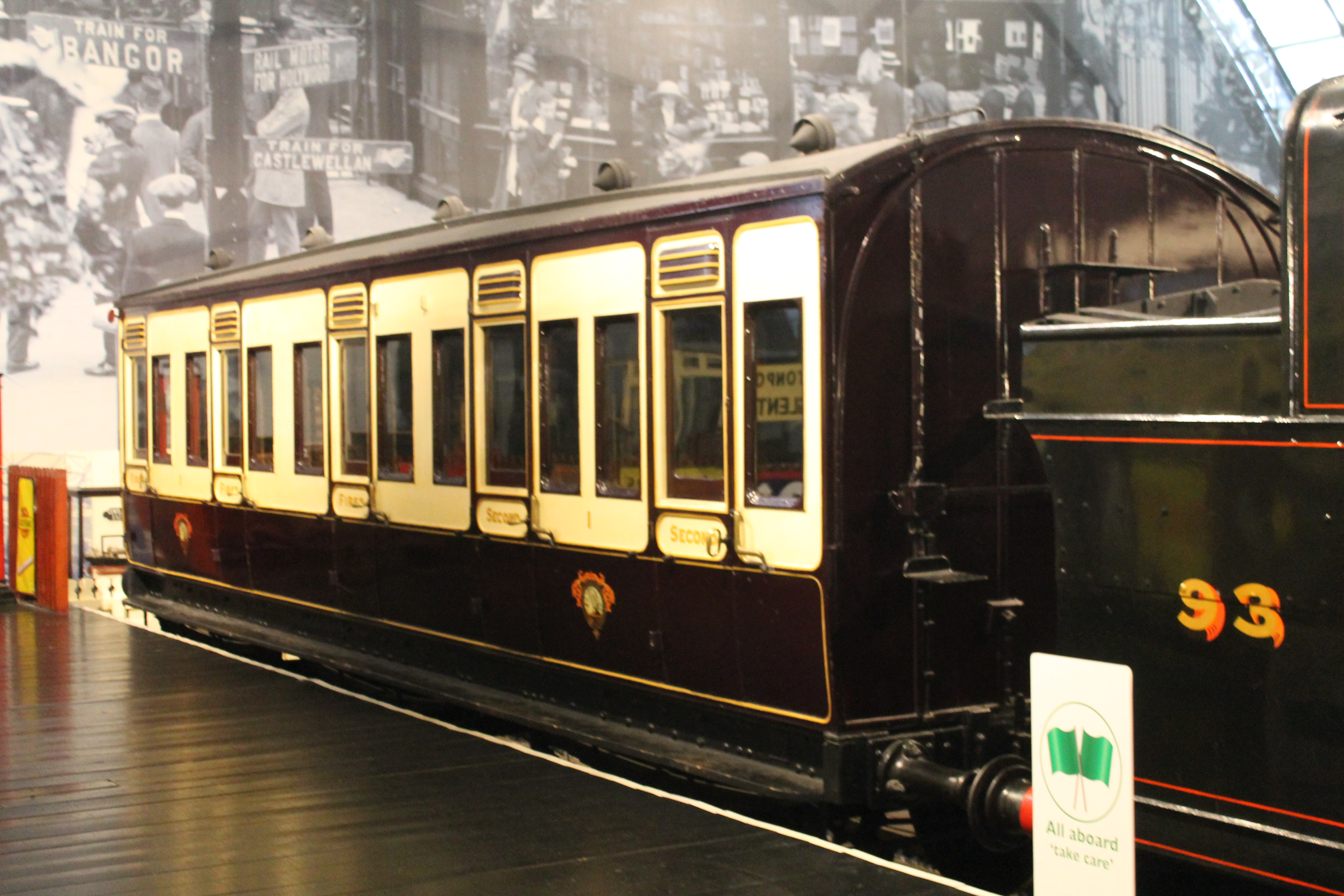
DNGR No. 1

One six-wheeled coach, DNGR No. 1 built in 1909, a composite with a coupé compartment, has been preserved at the Ulster Folk and Transport Museum, Cultra.

Consideration was given to the preservation of locomotive No.1 Macrory but, in the end, no locomotives were preserved. It is believed that this was because of an ill-informed belief among those in charge of its fate that the locomotive was of a different track gauge to the rest of Ireland, due to the fact that it was built and owned by a British company, although this was not the case. All of the locomotive nameplates have been preserved.

However, a GNR 2-4-2T JT class locomotive, No. 93, which worked on the DNGR line under GNR operation, has also been preserved and is displayed with the DNGR coach in Cultra.

== See also ==
- Locomotives of the Dundalk, Newry and Greenore Railway
- Newry, Warrenpoint and Rostrevor Railway - which ran on the other side of Carlingford Lough
