= Teeling =

Teeling may refer to:

== People ==
- Bartholomew Teeling (1774–1798), a leader of the Irish forces during the Irish Rebellion of 1798
- Mrs. Bartle Teeling (1851–1906), Guernsey writer
- Charles Teeling (1778–1850), Irish journalist and writer
- Emma Teeling, Irish zoologist and geneticist, specialising in studies of bats
- John Teeling, Irish academic turned serial entrepreneur
- William Teeling (1903–1975), Irish author, traveller and United Kingdom politician

== See also ==
- Teeling Column, one of the four armed units devised by Seán Cronin for the Border Campaign in the west of Ireland
- Teeling Distillery, an Irish whiskey distillery established in Dublin in 2015
