= Angelique Corthals =

Biomedical researcher and forensic anthropologist

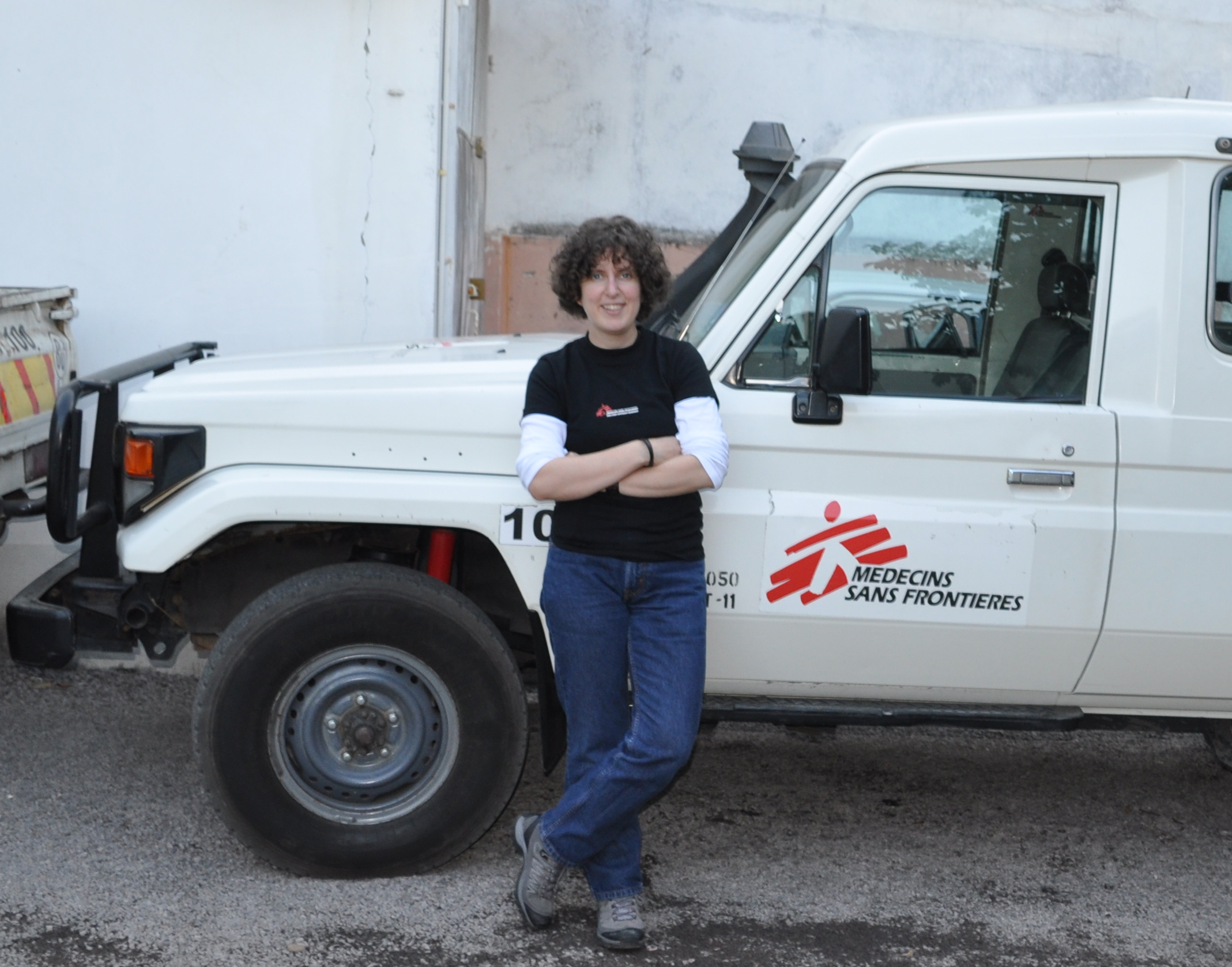
- Education: University of Oxford (MPhil, DPhil)
- Spouse: Liliana M. Dávalos
- Scientific career
- Fields: Biomedicine, forensic anthropology
- Workplaces: American Museum of Natural History, University of Manchester, Stony Brook University, City University of New York
- Website: https://www.aspcorthals.net/Site/Welcome.html

Angelique Corthals is a biomedical researcher and forensic anthropologist. She is an associate professor at John Jay College of Criminal Justice, City University of New York (CUNY). Her focus in biomedicine is the etiology of autoimmune diseases; as of 2020, she has been studying whether or not COVID-19 originated zoonotically in bats.

== Career ==
Angelique completed her DPhil (PhD) at University of Oxford, St. Cross College in 2003. She then held faculty and curatorial positions at the University of Manchester, the American Museum of Natural History, Stony Brook University, and was the scientific director of the Stony Brook BioBank. As of 2018, she is an associate professor at John Jay College of Criminal Justice, CUNY, where she was previously an assistant professor from 2009 to 2018.

As a cross-disciplinary scientist, her publications and research span many different fields and fall into four main categories:

- The role of metabolism in neurodegeneration, infectious diseases and aging

- New molecular and preservation protocols for specimens-based research, biobanking and field medicine

- Histomorphology, pathology and bioinformatics in Forensic Anthropology

- New infectious and non-transmissible diseases diagnostic technology solutions and clinical guidelines for Field Medicine in LMICs

== Personal life ==
Angelique grew up in Belgium and pursued degrees in violin and Slavonic studies before settling on biological anthropology.

She lives with her wife, Liliana M. Dávalos, on Long Island, New York. As a lesbian, she is involved in visibility campaigns for LGBT+ people in STEM.

Angelique is also a rower and sabre fencer.

== Filmography ==
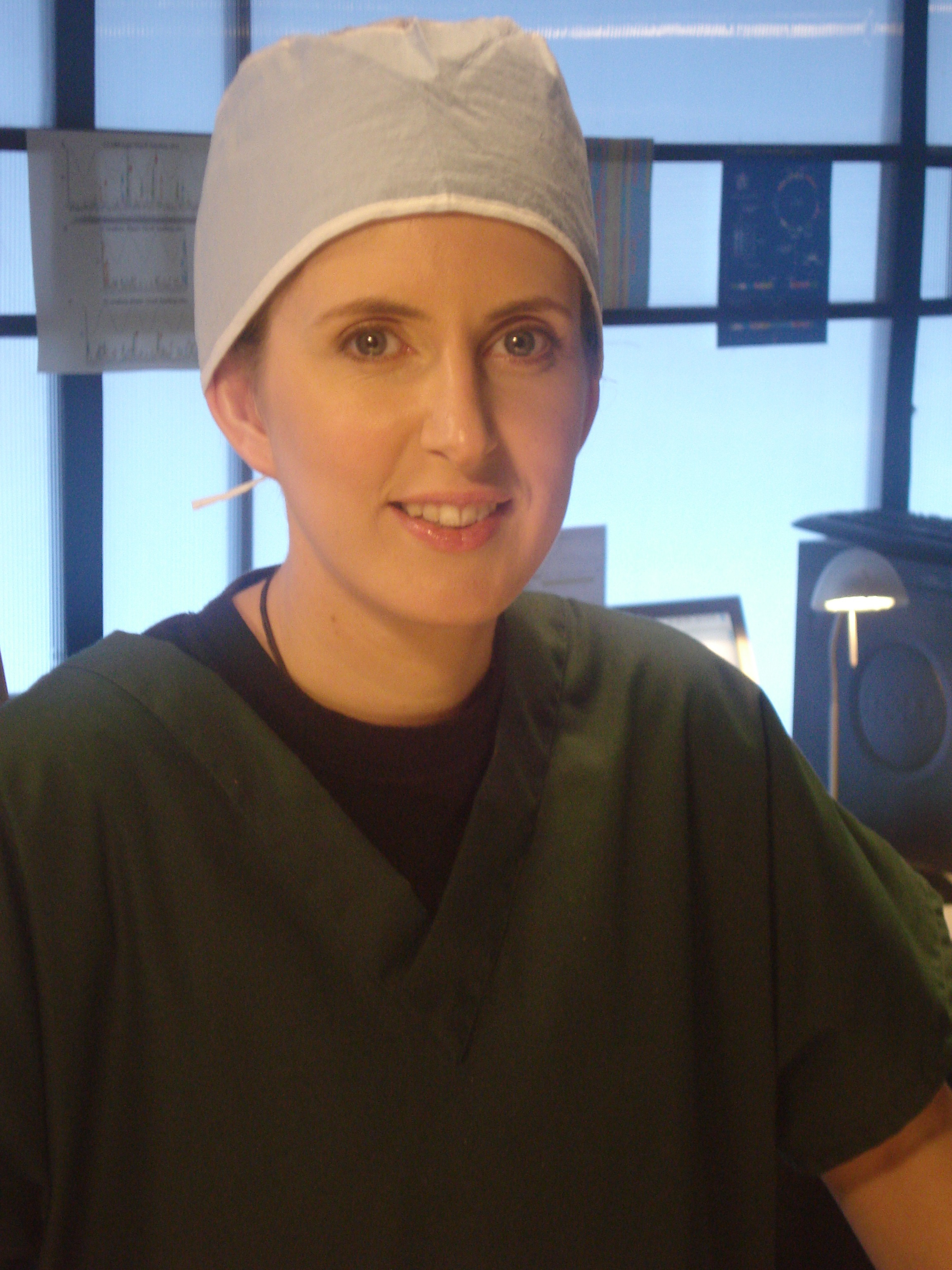
Angelique Corthals on the set of IMAX movie Mummies: Secrets of the Pharaohs, 2006

Angelique Corthals has been involved both off and on camera in the IMAX movie 'Mummies: Secrets of the Pharaohs', Discovery Channel 's 'Secrets of Egypt's Lost Queen', National Geographic's Explorer series 'Child Mummy Sacrifice' and in 2021, in Nova's 'Bat Superpowers'. She has been a consultant for the television series 'CSI' and 'Bones'. She has also been invited on numerous network television news broadcast as well as radio shows and various other media platforms.

Year	Title	Role
2021	Nova Bat Superpowers September 15, 2021	Self
2020	Les secrets des momies égyptiennes. The Secrets of the Pharaoh's Mummies - ARTE, Channel 5	Self
2009	National Geographic Explorer Child Mummy Sacrifice	Self
2007	Discovery Channel Secrets of Egypt's Lost Queen	Self
2007	IMAX Mummies: Secrets of the Pharaohs	Self

== Awards and recognition ==
- 2022: Recognition by the Fond Christophe Plantin Prize for contribution to the prestige of Belgium abroad.

- 2004: Elected Fellow Resident of the Explorers Club.

== Press ==
- Bats, museums, and viruses collide in this scientific love story
- Van archeologie tot microbiologie: deze Belgische topwetenschapper onderzoekt zowel farao's als vleermuizen
- New York City's Deadliest Day From Covid-19 Hit One Year Ago
- The Scientific Answer to Amelia Earhart is Lost in a Pile of Phantom Bones
- Pneu-mummy-a: Comparing the protein profile of a 500-year-old Inca mummy to modern humans reveals an active lung infection prior to sacrifice
- Disease Diagnosed in a 500-Year-Old Mummy
- The King Herself: the discovery of Hatshepsut
- A frail King Tut died from malaria, broken leg
- Species in a Second: Promise of DNA ‘Bar Codes’
- Is multiple sclerosis really an immune system disease?
- Have we been looking at Multiple Sclerosis all wrong?
