= Bat1K =

Genome sequencing project

Bat1K is a project to sequence the genomes of all living bat species to the level of chromosomes and then make the data publicly available. The project began in 2017.

== History ==
Bat1K was founded in 2017. Zoologist and geneticist Emma Teeling and neurogeneticist Sonja Vernes are co-founders. The Bat1K consortium includes researchers from institutions such as University College Dublin, University of Bristol, Max Planck Institute of Molecular Cell Biology and Genetics, and Max Planck Institute for Psycholinguistics. Notable members include Eugene Myers, Liliana M. Dávalos, Nancy Simmons, and Erich Jarvis. As of November 2017, there were 148 members in total, consisting of bat biologists, genome technologists, conservationists, and computational scientists.

== Applications ==
Several research areas could be furthered by documenting bat genomes. These include healthy ageing, disease resistance, ecosystem function and ecosystem services, sensory perception, communication, limb development, and mammal genome structure.

== Results ==
In 2020, the genomes of six species were published: the greater horseshoe bat, Egyptian fruit bat, pale spear-nosed bat, greater mouse-eared bat, Kuhl's pipistrelle, and the velvety free-tailed bat. These genomes were called "comparable to the best reference-quality genomes that have so far been generated for any eukaryote with a gigabase-sized genome". In 2020, the project's stated goal was to sequence an additional 27 genomes, with a representative from each family of bats, within the next year.

== See also ==
- Genome project
