= The Quarterly Review of Biology =

- Discipline: Biology
- Language: English
- Edited by: Liliana M. Dávalos

Publication details
- History: 1926–present
- Publisher: University of Chicago Press for the Department of Ecology and Evolution at Stony Brook University (United States)
- Frequency: Quarterly
- Open access: Hybrid
- Impact factor: 3.7 (2023)

Standard abbreviations
- ISO 4: Q. Rev. Biol.

Indexing
- CODEN: QRBIAK
- ISSN: 0033-5770 (print); 1539-7718 (web)
- JSTOR: 00335770
- OCLC no.: 223702870

Links
- Journal homepage; OnlineArchive

The Quarterly Review of Biology is a peer-reviewed scientific journal covering all aspects of biology. It was established in 1926 by Raymond Pearl. In the 1960s it was purchased by the Stony Brook Foundation when the editor H. Bentley Glass became academic vice president of Stony Brook University. The editor-in-chief is Liliana M. Dávalos (Stony Brook University). It is currently published by the University of Chicago Press.

== Aims and scope ==
The QRB has presented insightful historical, philosophical, and technical treatments of important biological topics since 1926. As the premier review journal in biology, the QRB publishes outstanding review articles of generous length that are guided by an expansive, inclusive, and often humanistic understanding of biology. Beyond the core biological sciences, the QRB is also an important review journal for scholars in related areas, including policy studies and the history and philosophy of science. A comprehensive section of reviews of new biological books provides educators and researchers with information on the latest publications in the life sciences.

== Abstracting and indexing ==
The journal is abstracted and indexed in Biological Abstracts, BIOSIS Previews, and the Science Citation Index.
