= Emma Teeling =

Irish zoologist and geneticist

Emma Teeling MRIA
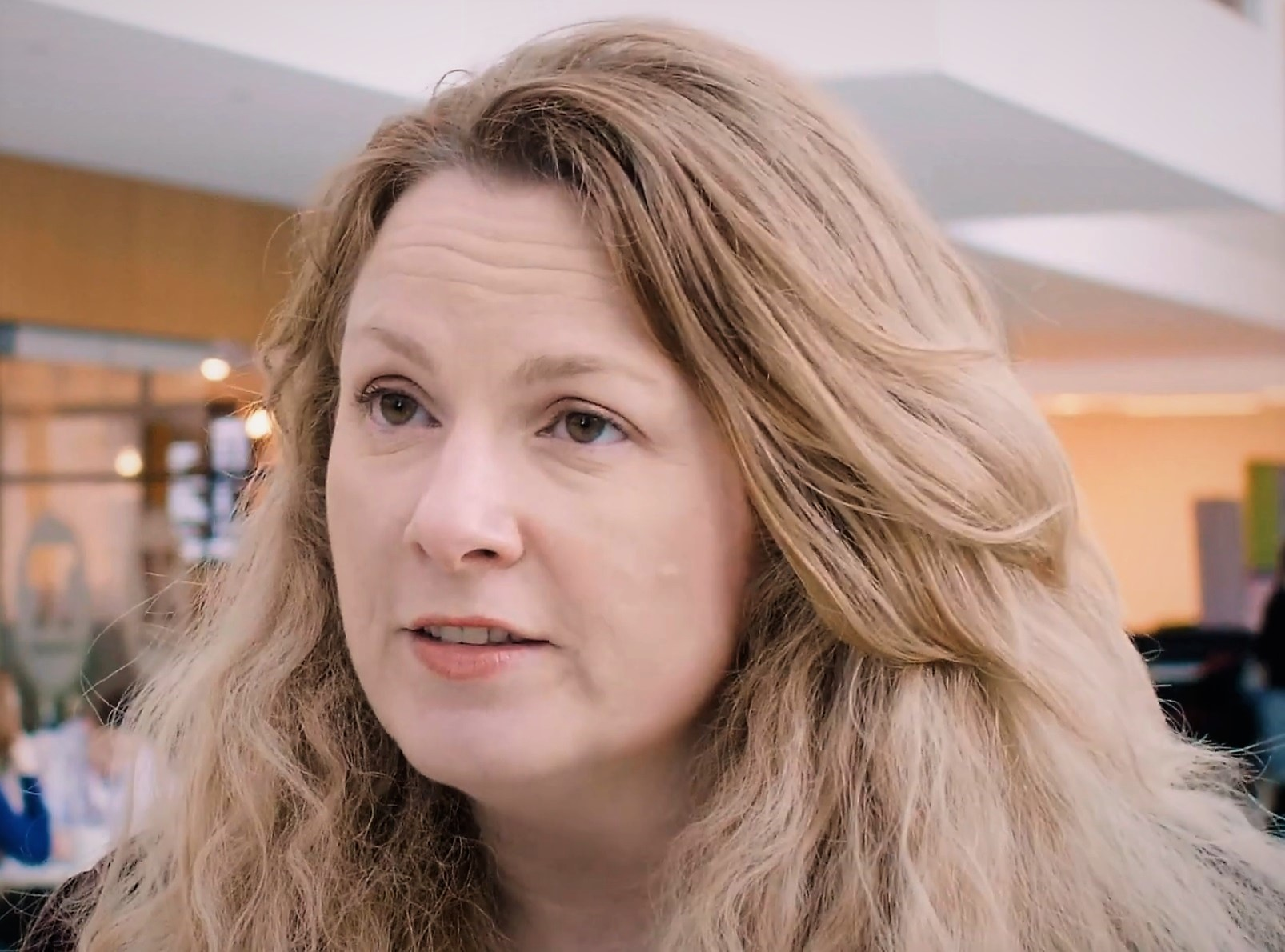
- Teeling for the Environmental Protection Agency (Ireland) in 2020
- Born: Clontarf, Dublin, Ireland
- Education: Holy Faith Secondary School, Clontarf
- Alma mater: University College Dublin (BSc), University of Edinburgh (MSc), Queen's University Belfast (with University of California at Riverside) (PhD)
- Known for: Studies of chiroptera (bats), including genome and longevity, and the possible application to human ageing and certain conditions
- Spouse: Peter T. Gallagher
- Children: 2
- Awards: Science Foundation Ireland (SFI) President of Ireland Award (2006), European Research Council Starting Investigator (2013-2018), Chevalier in the Ordre des Palmes académiques
- Scientific career
- Fields: Zoology, Genetics (Phylogenetics, Genomics)
- Institutions: University College Dublin (2005-), National Cancer Institute (2002-2005)
- Thesis: A molecular perspective on chiropteran systematics (2001)

Emma Caroline Teeling MRIA is an Irish zoologist, geneticist and genomicist, who specialises in the phylogenetics and genomics of bats. Her work includes understanding of the bat genome and study of how insights from other mammals such as bats might contribute to better understanding and management of ageing and a number of conditions, including deafness and blindness, in humans. She is the co-founder of the Bat1K project to map the genomes of all species of bat. She is also concerned with understanding of the places of bats in the environment and how to conserve their ecosystem.

Teeling is a full professor at University College Dublin, where she has founded two scientific centres: the Laboratory of Molecular Evolution and Mammalian Phylogenetics (also known as the "BatLab"), and the Dublin part of the Centre for Irish Bat Research. Teeling is widely cited in her areas of study and is an elected member of Ireland's national academy, the Royal Irish Academy.

== Early life ==
Emma Teeling was born to John and Deirdre Teeling. Her father is an academic, and serial entrepreneur in the mining, Irish whiskey and other sectors, while her mother is an academic in the area of education; they married in 1971. She has two younger brothers, Jack and Stephen, and she and her siblings grew up in Clontarf, where her father has his head office for multiple companies, and with her mother working in a school in nearby Coolock, another northern suburb of Dublin. She played Dublin-level camogie for Fairview. She attended Holy Faith Secondary School, Clontarf, and was the author of one of a set of short articles about late 1980s Moscow for a Soviet Supplement in the Irish Independent, after a school trip to the USSR.

== Higher education ==
From 1991 to 1995, Teeling took a B.Sc. in Zoology at University College Dublin (UCD), which included study of deer in Dublin's Phoenix Park. She further studied at the University of Edinburgh, for an M.Sc. in Animal Behaviour and Welfare, from 1995, including working with swift foxes at the Cochrane Ecological Institute in Canada. She then saw an advertisement for PhD studies relating to bats, and pursued this from 1997 at Queen's University, Belfast and the University of California at Riverside. She filed her thesis on A molecular perspective on chiropteran systematics in December 2001, and received her PhD in molecular phylogenetics from Queen's.

== Career ==
Teeling worked as a postdoctoral research fellow from 2002 to 2004 at the US National Cancer Institute. In 2005, she returned to Ireland to take a role as lecturer in Evolution and Genetics in the School of Biology and Environmental Science at UCD, securing tenure in 2006. She founded the Laboratory of Molecular Evolution and Mammalian Phylogenetics (known as the "BatLab" even in official materials) at UCD in 2005, and the Centre for Irish Bat Research at UCD in 2008; she remains one of the four Principal Investigators of this cross-border project, and its director. The Laboratory of Molecular Evolution and Mammalian Phylogenetics conducts a large amount of field work in Brittany, working with a conservation organisation, Bretagne Vivante. Teeling is also concerned with understanding of bat populations and their broader ecosystems, and bat conservation.

Teeling was promoted to associate professor (in Evolution and Genetics) in 2012, and later to full professor. She is also Head of Zoology. In addition to her research work, she teaches or coordinates a number of courses, and supervises PhD studies. As of 2020, she is also Deputy Director of UCD's Earth Institute.

=== Research and funding ===
Over the first 15 years since doctoral qualification, Teeling secured more than 4.4 million euro in research funding for her projects and laboratories. She was one of three applicants selected for a Science Foundation Ireland (SFI) President of Ireland Award in 2006, providing committed funding of over 1.2 million euro over its duration from October 2006 to March 2012 for comparative genomic studies in mammals. She also secured Science Foundation Ireland funding of over 200,000 euro for a study of the population dynamics and conservation status of a small bat, and a small grant for work around ecology and evolution with reference to bats.

Teeling secured an award from the European Research Council, for a Starting Investigator work (2013-2018), supported by further SFI commitments. This resulted in the Ageless project, considering how bats weighing as little as 7g can live for over 40 years, possibly due to optimised telomere management. Noting that the Myotis genus of bats don't appear to die from old age as such, Teeling commented "Studying wild bats in an ageing context may provide exciting new solutions to slow down the ageing process and ultimately extend human health-spans."

Teeling co-founded the Bat1K project to sequence the genomes of all living bat species. A report from this project, looking at the genomes of six bat species and mentioning Teeling and a colleague, was featured on the front cover of Nature magazine in 2020; this recognition was highlighted by the official University College Dublin Facebook page as "Congratulations to UCD's resident Batlady Prof Emma Teeling on making the cover of this month's @Nature with her newest genomic research."

=== Recognition ===
Teeling was elected to the highest academic honour in Ireland, membership of the national academy, the Royal Irish Academy, in 2016. In 2017, For her scientific work, she was awarded the rank of Chevalier in the Ordre des Palmes académiques; this award, known as "the purple", is the oldest civilian decoration in France, established by Napoleon. Her husband was also made a Chevalier at the time, for his work in astrophysics.

Teeling attended the World Economic Forum (WEF) conference in Davos, Switzerland in 2020 as a top level academic/think tank advisor. She was invited to present her work on ageing at the Forum, where she delivered a presentation entitled Bats and the Secret of Everlasting Youth in a closed session in January 2020.

After Davos, in late February 2020, Prof Teeling was invited as one of the speakers at the week-long Genomics Winter School within the Future Biotech Winter Retreat in Novosibirsk, Siberia, Russia, and to the leading genetic and cytological research facility of the Russian Federation, where she presented, and performed a "Q&A" session, on bats and longevity.

== Publication ==
Teeling has written and co-written many articles, papers and chapters, some of which are widely cited. Extant are more than 100 documents, with a citation level, per Scopus, of 6424 applications across 4751 citing documents, and a h-index of 31 ("very good"). Papers which Teeling has authored or to which she has contributed include:

- A molecular phylogeny for bats illuminates biogeography and the fossil record / Teeling, Emma C., Science, vol. 307, issue 5709, 28 January 2005, pp. 580–4
- Longitudinal comparative transcriptomics reveals unique mechanisms underlying extended healthspan in bats / Huang et al, Nature Ecology & Evolution, vol. 3, issue 7, July 2019, pp. 1110–1120
- The evolution of echolocation in bats / Jones, Gareth and Teeling, Emma C., Trends in Ecology & Evolution, vol. 21, issue 3, March 2006, pp. 149–156
- Hear, hear: the convergent evolution of echolocation in bats? / Teeling, Emma C., Trends in Ecology & Evolution, vol. 24, issue 7, July 2009, pp. 351–4
- How and why should we implement genomics into conservation? / McMahon, Barry J., Teeling, Emma C., Hoglund, Jacob, Evolutionary Applications, vol. 7, issue 9, Nov. 2014, pp. 999–1007
- Mammal madness: is the mammal tree of life not yet resolved? / Foley, Nicole M., Springer, Mark S., Teeling, Emma C., Philosophical Transactions of the Royal Society B: Biological Sciences, vol. 371, issue 1699, 19 July 2016
- Integrated fossil and molecular data reconstruct bat echolocation / Springer M.S. et al, Proceedings of the National Academy of Sciences of the United States of America, vol. 98, issue 11, 22 May 2001, pp. 6241–6246
- Parallel signatures of sequence evolution among hearing genes in echolocating mammals: an emerging model of genetic convergence / Davies et al, Heredity, vol. 108, issue 5, May 2012, pp. 480–9
- The adequacy of morphology for reconstructing the early history of placental mammals / Springer et al, Systematic Biology, vol. 56, issue 4, August 2007, pp. 673–684
- The evolution of color vision in nocturnal mammals / Zhao et al, Proceedings of the National Academy of Sciences of the United States of America, vol. 106, issue 22, 2 June 2009, pp. 8980–8985
- Ecological adaptation determines functional mammalian olfactory subgenomes / Hayden et al, Genome Research, vol. 20, issue 1, Jan. 2010, pp. 1–9
- Microbat paraphyly and the convergent evolution of a key innovation in Old World rhinolophoid microbats / Teeling et al, Proceedings of the National Academy of Sciences of the United States of America, vol. 99, issue 3, 5 February 2002, pp. 1431–1436

while chapters contributed include:

- Bats (Chiroptera) in The Timetree of Life (Hedges, Kumar, eds)
- Phylogeny, Genes, and Hearing: Implications for the Evolution of Echolocation in Bats in Bat Bioacoustics (Fenton et al., eds)

== Governance and voluntary roles ==
Teeling is a member of the Society for Molecular Biology and Evolution and was a member of the society's 2012 Annual Meeting Committee, which managed the event in Dublin, Ireland and later a member of the society's governing council. She is also on the editorial board of one of the society's two journals, the Journal of Molecular Biology and Evolution.

She is also a member of the editorial board of Oxford University Press's open-access journal Giga Science.

Teeling was appointed to the board of the Irish Research Council. She was elected as one of the professorial members of the Governing Authority of UCD in 2019, for a five-year term.

== Popular media ==
Teeling has presented a TEDx talk, on the genome of bats, which has been viewed, as of 16 June 2022, more than 565,000 times. University College Dublin has also uploaded one of her lectures, 'Bats: secrets of extended lifespan', to YouTube. She has been interviewed and featured on radio - on one occasion in episode 2 of a series, 'Bright Sparks', which also interviewed her astronomer husband, in episode 8, about his work - and television. On one occasion programme-makers accompanied her team when it was locating bats in old churches in Brittany. Following the release of the first six bat genomes by the Bat1K consortium, Teeling was interviewed by the BBC and commented on how bats' unique immune systems may help them defend against viruses, including COVID.

== Personal life ==
Teeling is married to astrophysicist Peter Gallagher, a senior professor at the Dublin Institute for Advanced Studies and adjunct professor at Trinity College Dublin, at the latter of which he worked for many years. They both came from Clontarf in Dublin but only met in first year Science in UCD. They lived near Washington D.C. for part of their time in the US during advanced studies, before moving back to Ireland together when Teeling received a job offer from UCD. They have two sons. Teeling invested in the first round of funding for her brothers' whiskey distillery company, the Teeling Whiskey Company, operating the Teeling Distillery, the first new distillery in Dublin for 125 years.
