= Peter T. Gallagher =

Irish astrophysicist and observatory director, specialised in solar physics

Peter T. Gallagher MRIA FRAS FTCD FInstP
- Born: Clontarf, Dublin, Ireland
- Education: University College Dublin (BSc), Queen's University Belfast (MSc, PhD)
- Known for: Solar studies, Ireland's first research-grade radio-telescope
- Spouse: Emma Teeling
- Children: 2
- Awards: Chevalier in the Ordre des Palmes académiques
- Scientific career
- Fields: Astrophysics, Astronomy
- Workplaces: Dublin Institute for Advanced Studies (and Trinity College Dublin)
- Thesis: Optical and EUV observations of the solar atmosphere (2000)

Peter Thomas Gallagher MRIA FRAS FTCD FInstP is an Irish astrophysicist and the director of Dunsink Observatory. He specialises in solar physics, notably solar storms and their impact on the Earth.

Gallagher is also Senior Professor, and Head of Astronomy and Astrophysics, at the Dublin Institute for Advanced Studies, and an adjunct professor at Trinity College Dublin. He is also the head of the radio-telescope project I-LOFAR, at Birr Castle. He is widely cited in his field and often quoted in the media.

== Early life and education ==
Peter T. Gallagher was born to Peter (died 2003) and Patricia Gallagher, of Clontarf, a northern suburb of Dublin. He has a brother and a sister. He attended the local Belgrove Primary School, and for secondary school, the Irish Christian Brothers' O'Connell School on North Circular Road, central Dublin. His father was a fitter and service engineer with Ingersoll Rand, and father and son worked with mechanical and electrical items in the family's back garden. Gallagher pursued chemistry and technical drawing for the Irish Leaving Certificate. He played Gaelic football to minor level with Clontarf GAA, and youth and adult rugby with Clontarf Football Club, and in his teens, he played lead guitar in a heavy metal/punk band.

He was the first member of his family to attend college, pursuing a Bachelor of Science at University College Dublin, where he studied a wide range of subjects but moved to focus on physics and specifically astronomy after being given a copy of A Brief History of Time as a present. He qualified with an honours B.Sc. in Physics and Maths in 1995, and secured a place on a funded Masters course in Optoelectronics at Queen's University Belfast, qualifying first in his year, with distinction, in Optoelectronics and Image Processing in 1996. After some work in the Canary Islands, he deepened his academic focus on astronomy and pursued a funded PhD from Queen's. He received an offer to work in the Department of Applied Mathematics and Theoretical Physics at Cambridge University, the department where Stephen Hawking worked, but declined this. He qualified in Astrophysics in 2000, having defended a thesis entitled Optical and EUV observations of the solar atmosphere.

== Career ==
Gallagher worked as a postdoctoral research fellow at two astronomical facilities of the New Jersey Institute of Technology, the Owens Valley Solar Array and the Big Bear Solar Observatory, both in California, and at NASA's Goddard Space Flight Center near Washington, D.C. Among other works he was able to take measurements with NASA's SOHO spacecraft. Having reached the level of Senior Scientist, he was offered a long-term NASA job, but wanted to return to Ireland, and when his wife was offered a post at University College Dublin (UCD) in 2005, they decided to move back together, even at significant reduction in pay, and he secured an initial job teaching Space Science at UCD before receiving an opportunity to head the Solar Physics & Space Weather Research Group at Trinity College Dublin (TCD) from the beginning of 2006. He worked on observations of the Sun, space weather including disruptive solar storms, and solar physics, and has been quoted by the media on these and related topics, such as the International Heliophysical Year, and certain space expeditions.

Shortly after returning to Ireland, he was asked to take a key role in twin NASA solar observation flights back in the US, designed to study the massively higher temperature of the Sun's corona compared to its actual upper layers. This was due to his experience in coordinating solar observations and developing specialised image interpretation software. In 2009 he and his team participated, with the Royal Observatory of Belgium, in a satellite project, PROBA-2, to study solar storms; they wrote software for two elements. The launch was successful, and was marked by a launch party in Trinity College's Science Gallery, attended by diplomatic representatives of Belgium, and of the Russian Federation, from where the launch was made.

In 2012 he was one of the lead signatories of a letter by a group of active scientists to the Irish Times which expressed concern as to the Irish government's lack of commitment to basic research, and the implications this could have for the country and the avoidance or risk of "brain drain". In 2015 he and some colleagues attempted a solar atmosphere observation from a fixed-wing Irish Air Corps aircraft with a special camera at the time of the last solar eclipse to be visible from Europe until 2026. Also in 2015, he led the building of a magnetometer network by TCD and the Dublin Institute for Advanced Studies, capable of detecting solar storm activity. Professor Gallagher's group also worked with Lockheed-Martin, Eirgrid, and other companies.

In 2018 Gallagher was appointed as Senior Professor and Head of Astronomy and Astrophysics by the Dublin Institute for Advanced Studies (DIAS); he remains an adjunct professor at Trinity College Dublin. As part of the role, he was also appointed as Director of the historic Dunsink Observatory, owned by the State and managed by DIAS, near Dublin. He has stated that he would like to open up the observatory campus, which is near a cycling and walking "greenway" along the Royal Canal of Ireland and the River Tolka, adding a coffee shop and growing visitor numbers from 5,000 to 50,000, making it s significant tourist and cultural attraction for West Dublin.

=== Radio telescope projects in Ireland ===
Visiting Birr Castle and demesne, the site of what was for decades the world's largest telescope, the Leviathan of Parsonstown, in search of a suitable site for radio-telescopy, Gallagher made an agreement with the Earl of Rosse to build a solar observatory. An initial simple vertical antenna site was made, and later elaborated, and Gallagher remains the director of what became the Rosse Solar Terrestrial Observatory. Birr, almost in the centre of the island and as a small town with no radio-intensive industry, was a good "quiet site" for sensitive radio-telescope instruments.

There followed a proposal by Gallagher for a major project, namely to build and integrate the Irish site of the Low-Frequency Array (LOFAR) major radio-telescope project, which would then run from Ireland to Laszy in eastern Poland, the addition of Ireland expanded its baseline and observational power by about 30%. He agreed the principle with Lord Rosse, then secured 50 thousand euro from Dermot Desmond, who then put him in touch with Denis O'Brien, who called and after discussion also wired a substantial contribution. Science Foundation Ireland later made a major award, of around 1.4 million euro. Multiple third-level institutions joined the project consortium, contributing around half a million euro collectively, and with other donations, such as from a local school in Birr, the project was able to proceed. The main components were delivered from the Netherlands, where LOFAR is headquartered (in Groningen), in 30 articulated trucks in summer 2016. The Irish Astronomical Association described Gallagher's role in this project as "almost single-handedly responsible for getting I-LOFAR approved, funded, designed, installed and operational" and the project itself thus: "I-LOFAR now the only astronomical facility producing top-end astronomical research results from the island of Ireland." The Irish LOFAR site was launched in July 2017, and its aims included monitoring of solar activity, light waves from the early history of the universe, and potential signals from intelligent extraterrestrial sources. The I-LOFAR telescope has 3,000 antennae and 55 km of cabling, and provides opportunities for a range of PhD and post-doctoral students, as well as lecturers and professors, to advance their work.

=== Outreach and popular media ===
Gallagher has expressed a personal interest in science promotion, and has described a special interest in schools from which fewer pupils progress to the sciences. He was involved with the first exhibition of the Science Gallery at Trinity College Dublin, LIGHTWAVE, co-producing with artist Anita Hill an exhibit entitled In the Heliosphere, which allowed visitors to feel an impression of the effect of solar flares. He remains a member of the advisory and creative panel at the Science Gallery, the Leonardo Group. His team were involved with, and he commented on, the sunspotter.org public "participative science" initiative.

Gallagher featured in episode 8, related to space, of the radio series "Bright Sparks", as broadcast on RTÉ Radio 1; his wife featured in episode 2 of the same series. As Director of I-LOFAR, Gallagher also co-presented a programme, "13 Billion Miles from Birr" on RTE TV, in 2017, to mark its launch and planned work.

=== Academic and professional bodies ===
Gallagher is a Fellow of the Royal Astronomical Society (FRAS). In 2026, he was elected a Member of the Royal Irish Academy (MRIA), the highest academic honour in Ireland. He was also elected a Fellow of the Institute of Physics (FInstP) in 2026, an accolade that represents the institute's highest level of membership.

He has been chairperson of the Astronomical Sciences Group of Ireland and vice-chairperson of the Royal Irish Academy's Astronomy and Space Research Committee. (Note: This committee consists of both members of the Academy and non-members such as Prof. Gallagher)

He was elected as a member of the Solar System Working Group of the European Space Agency (ESA), dealing with mission evaluations for 2015–2025, and of the ESA's 12-member Space Science Advisory Committee from 2017 to 2019.

=== Recognition ===
In 2017, Gallagher was awarded the rank of Chevalier in the Ordre des Palmes académiques for his scientific work; this award, established by Napoleon and known as "the purple", is the oldest civilian decoration in France. His wife was made a Chevalier at the same ceremony, for her work in phylogenetics and genomics. In 2026, he was made a member of the Royal Irish Academy.

== Publication ==
Gallagher has published a wide range of articles, and is, according to Scopus as of October 2020, highly cited, with a h-index of 37. His most-cited paper is "An observational overview of solar flares" in Space Science Reviews (2011), of which he was a co-author. His most-cited first-author paper is "Rapid acceleration of a coronal mass ejection in the low corona and implications for propagation" in the Astrophysical Journal Letters (2003).

== Personal life ==
Gallagher met his future wife, Emma Teeling, in the first year of his science degree at UCD. They kept in touch while pursuing advanced studies in Belfast and elsewhere, living near Washington, D.C., for part of their time in the US, and moving back to Ireland together when Teeling received a job offer. They have two sons. The Teeling-Gallagher boys developed a Minecraft LOFAR environment which was mentioned on the websites of the European and Irish LOFAR consortia. He coaches youth rugby teams at Clontarf FC.
