= Tyrconnell (whiskey) =

Irish whiskey brand

The Tyrconnell is a historic brand of Irish whiskey that has been revived by the Kilbeggan Distilling Company's Cooley Distillery owned by Suntory Global Spirits, a subsidiary of Suntory Holdings of Osaka, Japan.

The brand was previously owned by the Watt Distillery, which (according to the company) dates back to 1762. The Tyrconnell was their flagship brand, and was named after a racehorse owned by Andrew Alexander Watt. The horse was a chestnut colt that won at 100 to 1 odds in 1876 in the Irish horse race called The National Produce Stakes. A horse race is depicted on the label.

== Awards and ratings ==
Liquor ratings and review aggregator Proof66.com, which assembles expert evaluations of whiskies and other spirits, rates the Tyrconnell 10-Year Madeira Cask Finish among the 20 best whiskies in the world.

Tyrconnell Single Malt Sherry Finish was named Best Irish Single Malt at the 2013 World Whiskies Awards.

== Alternative brand expressions ==
Tyrconnell Finishes is a brand expression made by finishing 10-year-old Tyrconnell in sherry, port and Madeira casks. The Tyrconnell Madeira finish was named by whiskey author Jim Murray as the Best Irish Whiskey of 2008 in his Whiskey bible.

The brand also produces single cask expressions. The majority of Tyrconnell single casks are 15 years old.
