= Andrew Alexander Watt =

Businessman of Anglo-Irish Decent

Andrew Alexander Watt, JP, DL (4 November 1853 – 11 October 1928), was an Irish landowner and businessman with a net worth of over £900,000 at his death in 1928, worth £51.8 million in 2016. The Watt family were, by origin, an Ulster-Scots family from Ramelton in County Donegal.

== Early life ==
He was born in 1853 to Samuel Watt of Thornhill House, then on the northern outskirts of Derry, and his wife Jane Newman, daughter of Captain Robert Newman, R.N.. He was educated at Foyle College in Derry and then at home by tutors. The Watt family were Ulster-Scots gentry who had arrived at Claragh, on the outskirts of Ramelton in the north of County Donegal, during the Plantation of Ulster.

== Career ==
He was the owner of Watt's Distillery, located on Abbey Street in the Bogside in Derry, one of the largest distilleries in Ireland, and the creator of many whiskies, including the famous Tyrconnell, which he named after his racehorse that won the National Produce Stakes against the odds of 100 to 1. The horse itself was named after Tyrconnell (Irish: Tír Chonaill), the ancient túath or Gaelic kingdom that once covered most of what is now County Donegal in the west of Ulster.

During industrial unrest in 1921, brought about by the First World War, prohibition in the United States, and the Irish War of Independence, Watt's workers at the distillery in Derry were made redundant after challenging his authority. Watt is said to have stood on a barrel outside the gates to his distillery in Bogside, whilst the workers were on strike, and shouted, 'Well men, I shall put it to you like this …what is it to be? Will you open the gates?' To which the workers retorted, 'The gates stay shut!' This prompted Watt to reply, 'Shut they are, and shut they shall remain!' Watt subsequently closed down Watt's Distillery, at great economic expense to Derry and neighbouring areas of County Donegal.

== Personal life ==
On 7 October 1875, A.A. Watt married Violet Flora de Burgh, daughter of George de Burgh and Constance Matthews, with whom he had 4 sons and 2 daughters

He served as High Sheriff of County Londonderry from 1886 to 1887.

He was a member of Boodle's. He died at Easton Hall in Lincolnshire, where he lived in England after he left Ireland. Easton Hall was later demolished, in 1951.
