= Great Northern Brewery, Dundalk =

Former brewery in Ireland

Great Northern Brewery
- Founded: 1896
- Headquarters: Dundalk, Ireland
- Owner: Great Northern Distillery (previously also Irish Whiskey Company, before that Diageo)

The Great Northern Brewery, on the Carrick Road, Dundalk, County Louth, was an Irish brewery. It was home to Harp Lager, and was formerly owned by Diageo. In 2015 the brewery closed, and production of Harp Lager and other products was moved to St. James's Gate Brewery in Dublin. The site has since been bought by John Teeling, and converted for operation as a distillery, the Great Northern Distillery.

== History ==
The Great Northern Brewery, which commenced operations in 1896 in Dundalk, Ireland, was the second largest brewery in Ireland, after St James’s Gate Brewery. It was bought in the late 1950s by Smithwick's Ale of Kilkenny, and subsequently by Guinness, which became part of Diageo. Up until 1960, the brewery produced stout and ale. However, in response to an increased demand for lager at that time, Guinness converted the brewery into a modern lager operation.

Working with German master brewer, Dr Hermann Muender, who had worked in the Dom Brewery in Cologne, and local ingredients, Harp Lager was created. Within 12 months of launch in 1960, Harp had become an established brand throughout Ireland. A year later it was launched nationwide in Britain. This success meant that the brewery’s capacity had to be expanded to meet demand.

=== Expansion ===
The brewery had extensive facilities and it produced and packed a range of beers and ales, including Harp Lager, Smithwick's Ale, Satzenbrau Pils, Carlsberg and Warsteiner. Some 80 people were employed across a range of disciplines, including production, supply, customer service, technical and quality control. There was a substantial investment which saw the addition of a new brewhouse, additional fermentation vessels, a pall filtration plant and a carbonation/nitrogenation plant in the existing filtration centre.

=== Closure ===
On 9 May 2008, Diageo announced that the brewery, along with another plant in Kilkenny, would be closed by 2013, with operations moving to either St. James's Gate in Dublin or a new brewery to be built near Dublin. However, due to the declining property markets throughout the globe, Diageo reassessed its decision and put all closures on hold for a period, although the kegging facilities in Dundalk were moved to St James Gate. In effect this led to a reduction in staff from 82 to 53, not taking into account contractors.

On 30 September 2013, all brewing and processing ceased and the brewery was officially closed by Diageo. Dismantling and removal of certain facilities to St. James' Gate in Dublin continued into 2014.

== Great Northern Distillery ==
After Diageo closed the site, it was announced that John Teeling, founder of the Cooley Distillery and director of the Irish Whiskey Company, would acquire the site and convert the brewery into a distillery.

On 31 July 2015 distilling began for the first time with the brewery having been renamed as the Great Northern Distillery. The Great Northern Distillery became the second largest and only the third grain distillery in Ireland. Products include various forms of whiskey, some spirit, and gin. It maintains the use of spring water from the Cooley Peninsula as a key feature of production, just as the brewery had before.
