= John Teeling =

Irish academic and serial entrepreneur

- Born: January 1946 (age 80); Dublin, Ireland
- Known for: Renewal of the Irish whiskey industry
- Spouse: Deirdre Teeling
- Children: 3, including Emma Teeling

Academic background
- Education: University College Dublin (B.Comm., M. Econ. Sci.), University of Pennsylvania (MBA), Harvard University (DBS)
- Thesis: The Evolution of Offshore Investment (1975)

Academic work
- Discipline: Business administration, finance
- Institutions: University College Dublin

John James Teeling (born January 1946) is an Irish academic and businessperson, notable for the wide range of businesses he has developed or overhauled over several decades. In particular, he broke the Irish Distillers monopoly which existed in the Irish whiskey industry, by launching the Cooley Distillery, and reopened the 1757-founded Kilbeggan Distillery after a 50-year hiatus. He is also notable for having brought ten companies to public listing on the London Stock Exchange, the most of any Irish person. Teeling lectured at University College Dublin's business school for over 20 years. He authored a number of educational texts, for primary school and college.

== Early life and education ==
John James Teeling was born in January 1946, the eldest of the four children of James "Jimmy" B. Teeling (died 1960) and Emma "Emily" Teeling (née Kinsella, died 2005) of Hollybrook Road in Clontarf, a suburb of Dublin, where he grew up. His father was a Royal Liver Assurance agent, and Teeling has said that his family were neither rich nor poor, but were the first on their street to buy a television and a car. His father also ran a small legal money-lending business, and John Teeling helped with this from the age of 12. With his father dying suddenly at home when John was 14, his mother assumed management of the money-lending business, with John taking certain responsibilities within it while also working as a van boy for IR£1.50 a week, and completing school at St Joseph's CBS, Fairview.

After school, Teeling secured a job in the Irish Electricity Supply Board (ESB) but he did not feel he fitted the organisation and instead won and took up a Dublin Corporation scholarship to University College Dublin (UCD), where he qualified with a Bachelors of Commerce, and then a Masters in Economic Science. After graduation from UCD, he secured further scholarship funding, from the Friendly Sons of St. Patrick, to attend the Wharton School of the University of Pennsylvania, where he took an MBA. In 1970, again securing scholarship support, this time from the Ford Foundation, he began to attend Harvard University, where, having studied the collapse of the Irish whiskey industry from accounting for 60% of world whiskey sales to holding a market share of under 2%, he completed a Doctorate in Business Studies in 1975. From an early stage he also performed private share dealings based on the Benjamin Graham model, over the early 1970s making what was described as a "small fortune", and continuing with significant share dealing until the mid-1980s.

== Career ==
=== Academia ===
Teeling accepted a lecturing post at UCD in 1969, at IR£19 a week. He taught at the university, in areas including Commerce and Business Administration, until 1988, when the demands of his business interests intervened. During this period he also authored or co-authored a number of educational works.

=== Minerals and other investments ===
In the early stage of his work as a lecturer in finance and business at UCD, in 1969, Teeling was asked to provide some consultancy for Northgate Exploration, owners of the Tynagh Mine in County Galway, then the largest in Ireland and then David Boyd Barrett asked him to take a consultant role with the new Tara Mines in County Meath, working from offices in Clontarf. In addition to geological and other physical surveys, Teeling analysed placenames in Ireland to locate traditional areas where metals had been sourced historically.

Teeling and various partners including Donal Kinsella also invested in a range of non-mining businesses. His policy was to buy in on value investing principles – he summarised his approach as attacking "moribund public companies with under-used assets" – rationalising or selling main business elements, and selling off, for example, unneeded properties. By 1986 the companies he had bought into and re-structured included large textile manufacturers Seafield Gentex and Glen Abbey (in total Teeling worked with seven textile companies), Irish Wire Products, Irish Oil and Cake Mills, Irish Pharmaceuticals, and Dublin Gas. In the case of Dublin Gas, Teeling and Donal Kinsella bought-in, in the hope that gas might be discovered in recoverable quantities off the Dublin coast, and also with the idea of drawing fibre optic cables through the gas pipe network; Teeling exited soon after by selling his shares to Irish Life at a profit. For most of the period Teeling worked part-time at UCD but he did take a break from lecturing for two years to work on Seafield Gentex. Although firmly declining investment in property at a personal level, owning only his home and one neighbouring house, Teeling was chairman of a property company, Countyglen, for several years.

In 1983 Teeling launched Minquest, an exploration investor which took shares in, and drove reforms of, a number of Irish mineral and hydrocarbon operations, including Kenmare Resources, Ovoca and Irish Marine Oil. The company's licences were eventually sold to Conroy and Teeling described the venture as so profitable that it was hard to repeat, saying "I should have quit after Minquest but I now wanted to set up and manage..." He later set up African Gold, and when he sold that, managed a spin-off, West African Gold, and Botswana Diamonds, which in turn established a diamond-prospecting joint venture with Alrosa. Other projects included Pan Andean Resources, Persian Gold, Clontarf Energy, Petrel Resources, and Connemara Mining (later Arkle Resources). He pursued opportunities in Ireland, Bolivia, Iran, Zimbabwe, Botswana, and other countries.

He operates his businesses from a rented office building originally held by David Boyd Barrett, on the coast in Clontarf, near his home; it has been described as "spartan" and he describes his approach as "I don't do overheads". He disclaims deep understanding of IT but has described biotechnology and DNA, an area in which his daughter, academic Emma Teeling, works, as "the Internet of the future". While mostly overseeing his ventures as chairman or executive chairman, and delegating routine management, Teeling has sometimes worked as managing director. As of July 2020, he has assumed the position of acting CEO at Arkle Resources plc., following the abrupt departure of the previous CEO.

=== Distilling ===
==== Cooley ====
Teeling was a long-term believer in the potential of the Irish whiskey market, stating that it has a gross return level on the order of 15 times base costs. He explored the possibilities of whiskey distilling in the early 1970s while studying for a doctorate at Harvard, and wrote two related papers in 1971. In 1987, Teeling founded the Cooley Distillery, on the Cooley Peninsula in County Louth, taking over a disused State spirit factory, operated by Ceimici Teoranta. The project, which broke a monopoly in Irish whiskey production held by Irish Distillers, took 11 years to reach annual profitability, and 15 years to make an accumulated surplus. He also took over Locke's Distillery in Kilbeggan, disused since the 1950s, and after a period operating simply as a maturing location, it resumed full-scale production, as Kilbeggan Distillery, from 2007.

Shortly after the previous monopoly whiskey manufacturer Irish Distillers was bought out by Pernod Ricard in 1988, it offered to buy Cooley for IR£24.5 million, with an openly stated plan to close the business and raze the distillery. The offer, which would have provided a profitable payback to Cooley's investors, was blocked by Irish competition authorities, and subsequent financial challenges required Teeling to urgently secure stock advance sales and other financings, including further substantial personal investment. Teeling commented that there were in all three critical moments in the business's history when urgent financing was needed. The first distilling was completed in 1989, and after several years in casks, that first whiskey was released under the Tyrconnell brand in 1994. Initially targeting markets in Spain and Portugal, the company found new potential in post-Soviet markets. A sale to CL Financial almost materialised for €33 million in 2002, and it was also almost sold to William Grant & Sons, before finally being bought for €72.8 million by Beam in 2012. Teeling commented that the aftermath of the sale was the first time he had been out of debt since before his marriage, probably since he was 17, having had loans for expenses related to his education and business ventures.

==== After Cooley ====
Teeling bought the former Harp Brewery in Dundalk, County Louth, in 2013, after the brewing operation had been moved to St James's Gate in Dublin by Diageo. The venture was started with his Irish Whiskey Company, and this was bought out by another Teeling family enterprise, Great Northern Distillery Ltd., in a deal which valued the enterprise, at this early stage, at over €120 million. The business trades as Great Northern Distillery and primarily sells to own brands or private labels and others needing a supply of bulk whiskey; as of 2017, it was producing over 6 million litres annually. Teeling also invested in a 7% shareholding in his sons' Teeling Whiskey Company in 2012, alongside a similar investment by his wife; this company later went on to open the first new distillery in Dublin in 125 years, the Teeling Distillery.

=== Public profile ===
Teeling is a high-profile figure in Irish business, regularly quoted in the media. He also performs talks and speeches at business group meetings and other events.

== Publications ==
Teeling has written or co-authored a number of academic texts, one for primary school, the remainder for tertiary studies:

- Financial Management (1971, 2nd edition 1976), with MacCormac, M.J.
- International Business: A Selected Bibliography (1973)
- Tara Mines (Dublin, Ireland, 1977: text – Teeling, John and illustrations – Jay, John)
- Business Organisation (1979)
- Modern Irish Business (1985)

== Personal life ==
Teeling married Deirdre Teeling in 1971; they have three children and have lived throughout in the same house on Seafield Road in Clontarf. He also bought the neighbouring house to prevent any development there. Deirdre Teeling is an educationalist, who worked for many years as a guidance counsellor in second-level Mercy College in nearby Coolock. Emma, Jack, and Stephen, and several grandchildren. Of the children, Emma Teeling is a zoologist, genomicist and evolutionary biologist, and a professor at UCD, while Jack and Stephen worked at Cooley Distillery, and then went on to set up their own distillery project, the first new distillery in Dublin in 125 years.

John Teeling is a teetotaler. He continued to play rugby union football into his 70s; he also follows cricket. His brother Jim (James), who died in 2014, taught Business Studies in the secondary school they had attended, St Joseph's, Fairview, to which John Teeling has contributed with scholarships and funding for after-school classes.
