= County Museum Dundalk =

- Músaem Chontae Dhún Dealgan
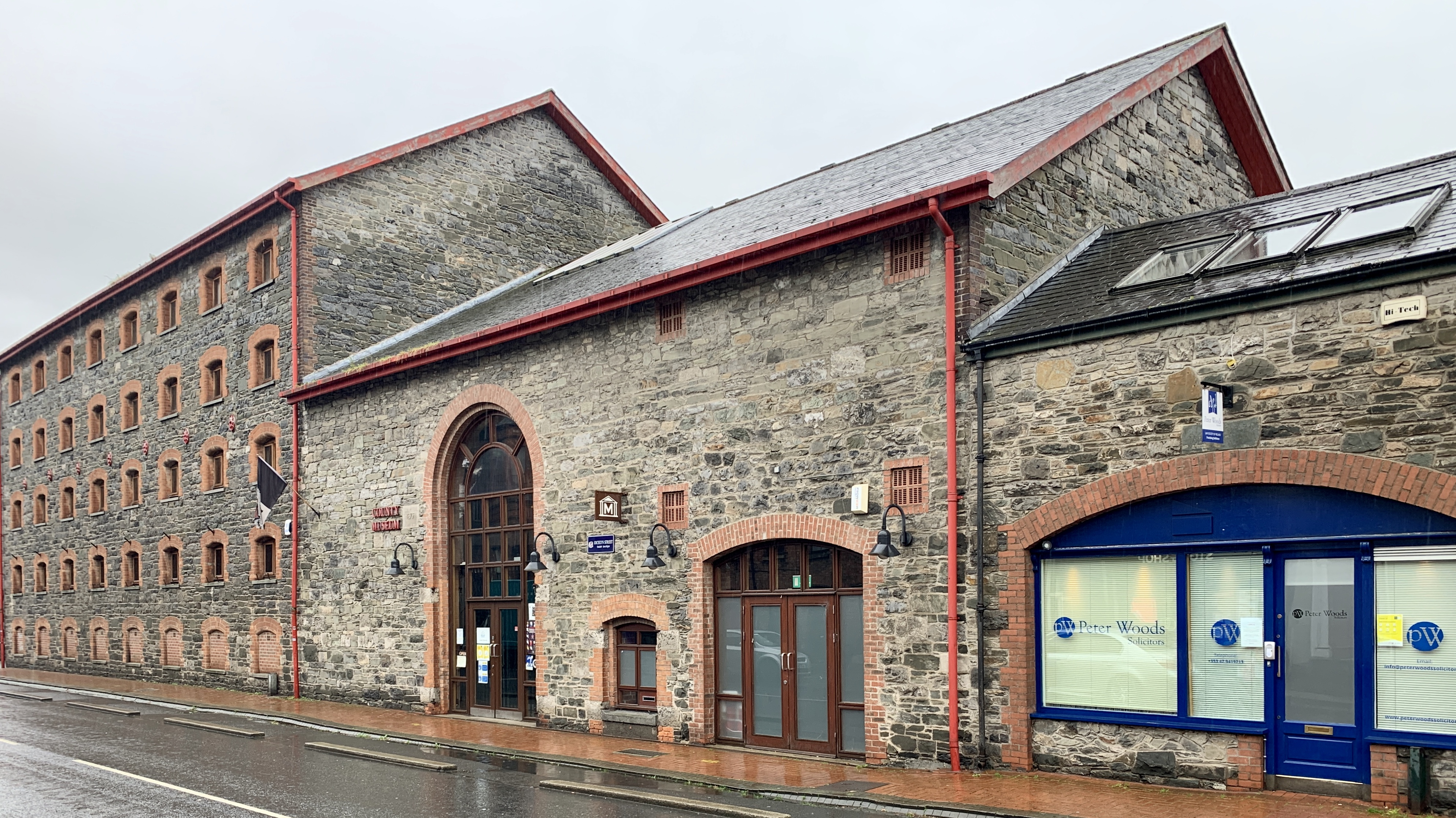

- Location within Ireland
- Established: 1994
- Location: Dundalk, County Louth, Ireland
- Coordinates: 54°00′17″N 6°23′49″W
- Type: County museum
- Curator: Brian Walsh
- Website: dundalkmuseum.ie

County Museum Dundalk (Irish: Músaem Chontae Dhún Dealgan) is a museum located in Dundalk which documents the history of County Louth. The museum is housed in the Carroll Centre at Roden Place in Jocelyn Street, in a restored 18th century warehouse which was once part of Dundalk Distillery.

== History ==
The building in which the museum is located was originally the grain store of a distillery established in 1780. The distillery ceased distilling in 1926, and the grain store was subsequently purchased by P.J. Carroll & Co., a tobacco company, for use as a warehouse or bond store. With the decline in cigarette sales, the warehouse was presented to the Dundalk Urban District Council in 1989 on the proviso that it be used as an interpretative centre. The refurbished and restored building was opened in 1994 and is funded by Dundalk Town Council.

The museum has won a number of awards, including two Gulbenkian Museum of the Year Awards (1995 and 1999), Gold Award For the Best Commissioned Display (1995) and Interpret Ireland Award (2000). It was also named as the Best Local Authority Museum by Irish Public Sector Magazine Awards 2014.

== Contents ==
The collections document the history of County Louth, from the Stone Age to the present, in three permanent exhibition galleries. Some of the objects on display are examples of Irish rock art, and objects relating to Oliver Cromwell. In 2013, the museum incorporated a 'virtual presenter' into the exhibitions, developed by Casio. This is believed to be the first of its kind introduced to a European museum.

The museum is designated by the National Museum of Ireland to collect archaeological finds. The museum also hosts a programme of temporary displays, drama presentations, music recitals, lectures and films.
