= Harp Lager =

Irish lager

- Inception: 1960
- Manufacturer: Diageo
- Website: Diageo.com: Harp lager
- Notes; Pale lager

Harp Lager is an Irish lager created in 1960. Since 2013, it has been produced by the Guinness Brewery in Dublin. Prior to this, it was produced at the Great Northern Brewery in Dundalk. It is a major lager brand throughout most of Northern Ireland, but is now rarely available in the Republic of Ireland outside Dundalk, where most bars offer it on tap.

== History ==
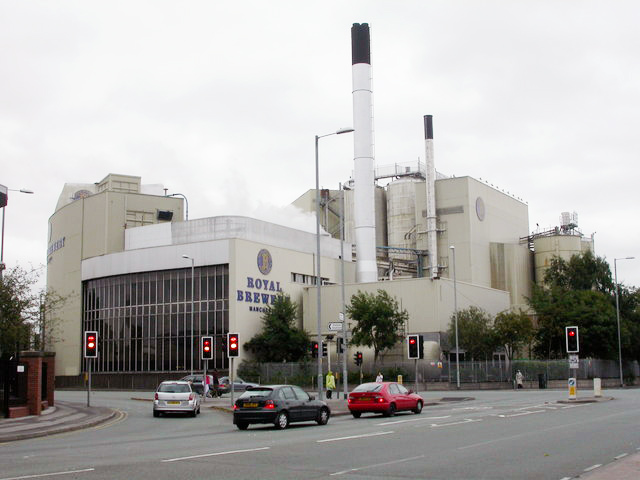
The Royal Brewery, Moss Side, Manchester where Harp Lager was formerly brewed

Harp Lager was first produced in 1960 as a bottled beer by Guinness, in response to the popularity of Continental lager amongst drinkers in Ireland and Britain. Guinness converted its Dundalk brewery into a lager production plant with the guidance of Dr. Herman Muender, a German brewer. Various names were considered for the brand before Harp was chosen, including Atlas, Cresta, and Dolphin. The brand uses the Brian Boru harp as its emblem. By the mid-to-late 20th century, the Dundalk (or Great Northern) Brewery became the second-largest brewery in Ireland.

In 1961, a consortium of brewers, Courage, Scottish & Newcastle, Bass, Mitchells & Butlers and Guinness, grouped together as Harp Lager Ltd. to brew and market the beer. Courage's Alton Brewery was rebuilt to produce the lager in Great Britain. By 1964, the product was sold on draught and was leader in sales for its category. Member groups of the Harp consortium changed over the years, with Courage and Scottish & Newcastle leaving in 1979 (though both groups became franchisees).

Currently available both on draught and in 330ml and 500ml bottles, its top market is Ulster, being popular in Northern Ireland, County Donegal, and its place of origin, Dundalk, County Louth, where it still maintains a cult status. The company's once-significant role in the community through sponsorship at a number of levels, particularly the Dundalk Maytime Festival and Dundalk FC, have helped retain its popularity in Dundalk.

In 2005, Harp underwent a brand makeover as Diageo Ireland separated the brand from Guinness.

The last Harp from Great Northern was brewed in 2013, after which production moved to St James's Gate Brewery, Dublin.

In Australia, distribution is handled by Carlton & United Breweries. In North America, exports are labelled "imported from Ireland" and are brewed at Guinness' St. James Gate brewery in Dublin.

== Marketing ==
For many years, the slogan "Harp stays sharp", coined by the advertising executive Rod Allen, was used in advertisements. Recently it has used the slogan "Look on the Harp side" and, in Northern Ireland, “Harp, Pure here”.
