= Cooley Distillery =

Whiskey distillery in County Louth, Ireland

- Location: County Louth
- Coordinates: 53°59′47.9″N 6°13′17.6″W
- Owner: Suntory Global Spirits
- Founded: 1987
- Founder: John Teeling
- Status: Operating
- No. of stills: 2 pot stills (wash still: 16,000 L, spirit still: 16,000 L; 3 column stills)
- Website: www.cooleywhiskey.com

Connemara Peated Single Malt
- Cask type(s): Bourbon Casks
- ABV: 40%

Kilbeggan Blend
- Cask type(s): Fresh Bourbon Casks, small portion in 2nd and 3rd
- ABV: 40%

Tyrconnell Single Malt
- Cask type(s): Bourbon Casks
- ABV: 43%

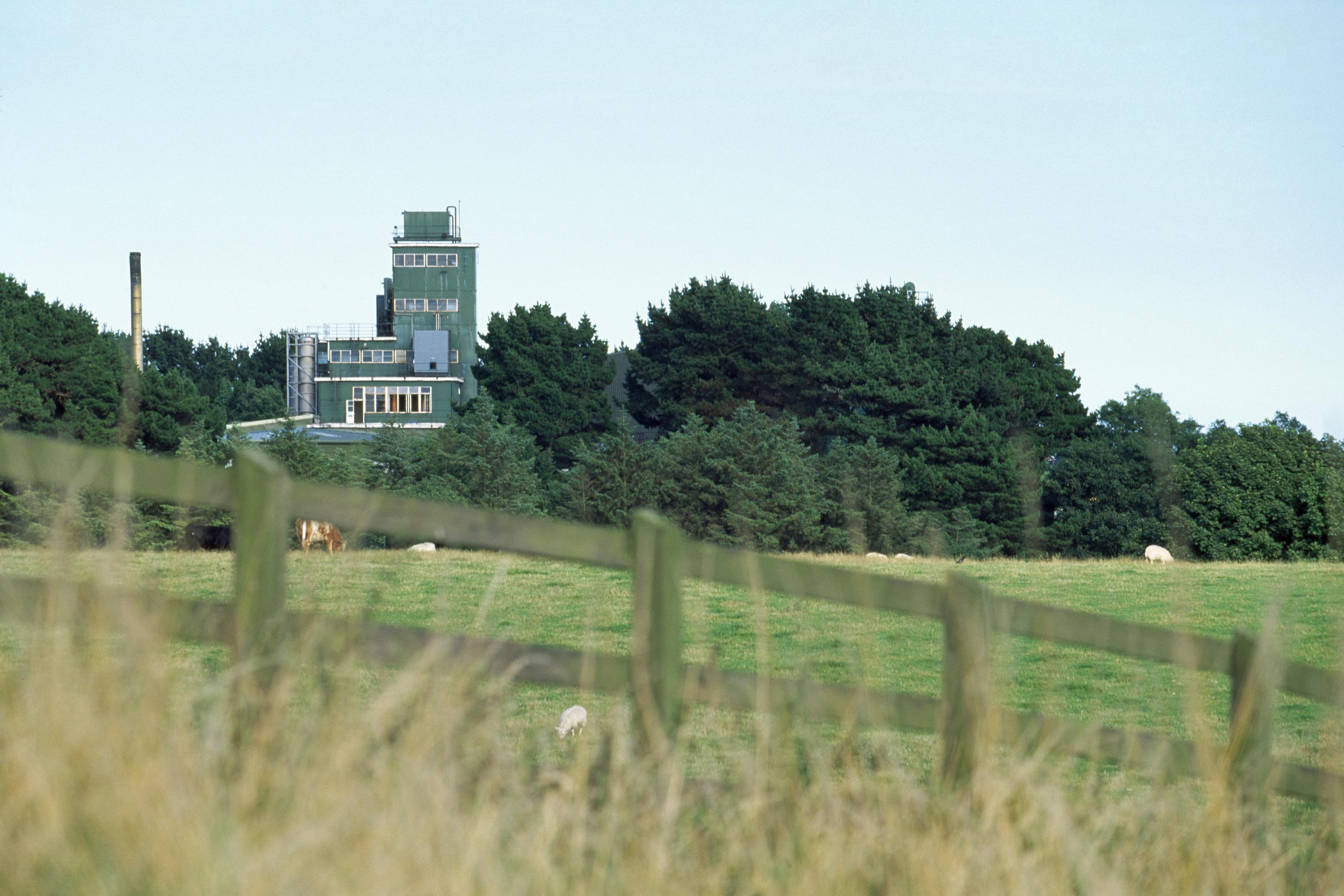
Cooley Distillery in the Cooley Mountains

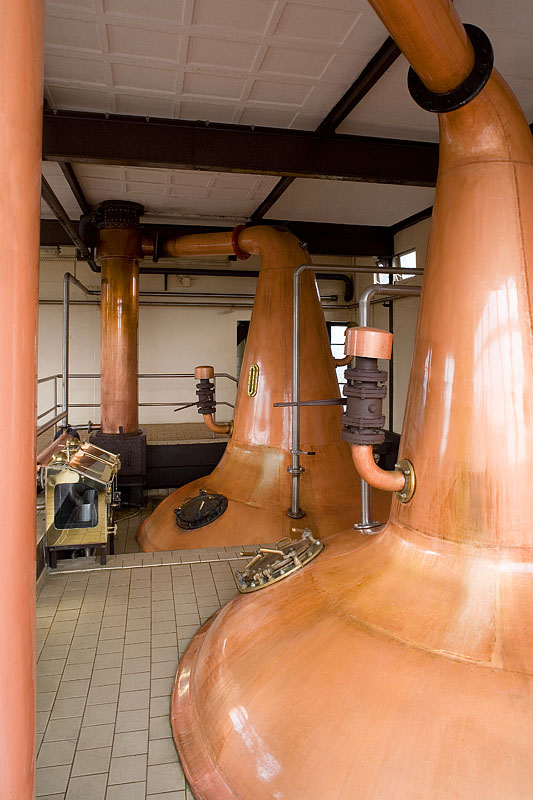
Cooley's copper pot stills

Cooley Distillery is an Irish whiskey distillery on the Cooley Peninsula in County Louth, Ireland established in 1987 and owned by Suntory Global Spirits, a subsidiary of Suntory Holdings of Osaka, Japan.

The distillery was converted in 1987 from an older potato alcohol plant by entrepreneur John Teeling. On 16 December 2011 Beam Inc. announced plans to purchase Cooley for around US$95 million (€71 million); the deal closed a month later, and the distillery now belongs to Suntory Global Spirits, since Suntory bought Beam in 2014.

== History ==
John Teeling bought a former State-owned industrial potato alcohol distillery in 1985. In less than two years, Teeling converted the distillery to have two column stills. In 1998, Cooley received a trophy at the International Wine and Spirit Competition (IWSC) for outstanding quality, and for earning an impressive reputation over time. Cooley was the first distillery to be awarded the trophy.

On 16 December 2011 Beam Inc. announced plans to purchase Cooley for around US$95 million (€71 million). The sale closed on 17 January 2012. Beam was then purchased by Suntory Holdings of Osaka, Japan on 30 April 2014, and since became its Suntory Global Spirits subsidiary. Since the change of ownership, visitor access to the distillery is limited and public tours are not available.

Following the sale, John Teeling went on to found the Great Northern Distillery in the nearest town, Dundalk, and his two children, Jack and Stephen, established the Teeling Whiskey Company in Dublin, establishing their brands using stock acquired from Cooley under the terms of the sale agreement with Beam, while building and bringing into production the Teeling Distillery.

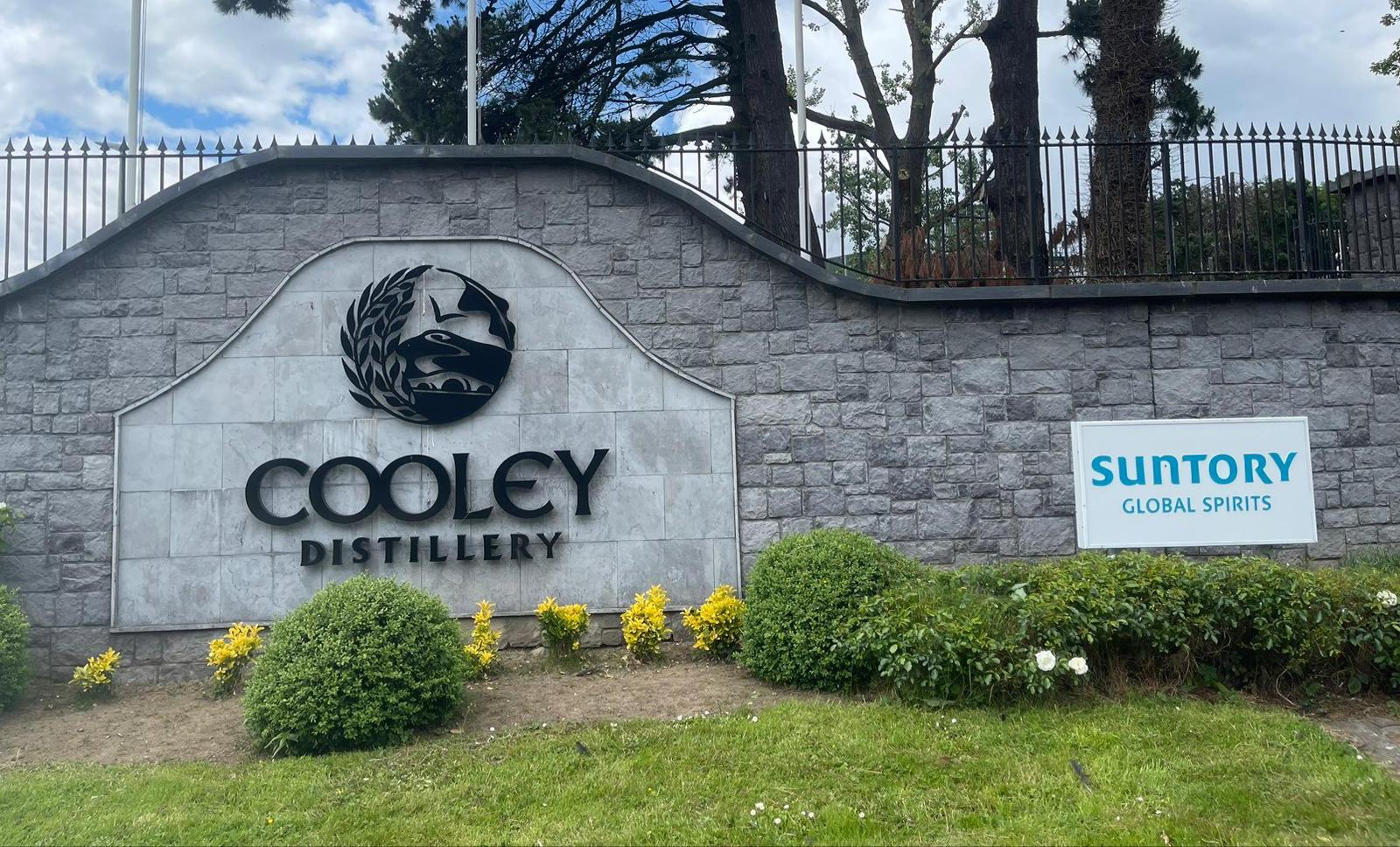
Cooley June 2024

== Product range ==
=== Current products ===
- Kilbeggan – a blended whiskey, Kilbeggan was originally distilled at the Kilbeggan Distillery, which was bought by Cooley in 1987. Best known for its non-age-stated version, in 2007, a 15-year aged version was released. An 18-year aged whiskey has also been released.
- Kilbeggan Single Grain – formerly marketed as Greenore, this is a single grain whiskey, made with corn alone, and aged in Bourbon casks. Kilbeggan Single Grain is found with several age statements; 6-, 8-, 15-, and 18-year versions are produced, although the 15- and 18-year releases are relatively rare (5,000 and 4,000 bottles, respectively).
- Connemara – a peated single malt whiskey, Connemara is double-distilled rather than the more usual triple-distillation process that most Irish whiskeys undergo. It is aged in Bourbon casks. Several versions are found; single-cask, cask-strength, 12-year, and a high-peat version called "Turf Mór."
- The Tyrconnell – a single malt whiskey, The Tyrconnell was acquired as a brand by Cooley in 1988 after being dormant since 1925, when the old Watt's Distillery (the original producers of The Tyrconnell) closed.
- 2 Gingers – A blended whiskey founded in 2011 by Minnesota bar owner and businessman Kieran Folliard. The 2 Gingers Whiskey Co. was acquired by Beam Inc. a year after the product was initially released.

=== Former products ===
Cooley also released a single pot still poitín, which was available at the Celtic Whiskey Shop in Dublin and at Dublin Airport, with the intention of expanding production to release it in other markets such as the US. However, this has since been discontinued. Similarly, Michael Collins, a single malt whiskey produced for the US market, was discontinued after the distillery was bought by Beam in 2012.

== Distillation process ==
The distillery features both column stills and pot stills for distillation. Unlike most other Irish whiskeys, which are usually distilled three times, Cooley's products are generally distilled twice, as the third distillation is thought to remove some of the flavour components.

== Critical acclaim ==
Cooley has won over 300 medals since opening. Other awards they have received include "European Distiller of the Year" in 2008 and 2009 and "Distillery of the Year" in 2008 from the International Wine and Spirit Competition and "Distillery of the Year" in 2010 from Malt Advocate magazine.

Individual item awards for Cooley's products include an IWSC "Best in Class" for Kilbeggan in 2005, an IWSC Gold Medal for The Tyrconnell in 2004 IWSC Gold Medal and Best in Class in 2010 for Greenore, and a World Whiskies Awards Best in Class in 2011 and 2012 for Greenore.

== See also ==
- Irish whiskey brands
- Kilbeggan Distillery
