= Teeling Distillery =

Whiskey distillery in Dublin, Ireland

Coordinates: 53°20′16.3″N 6°16′36.6″W

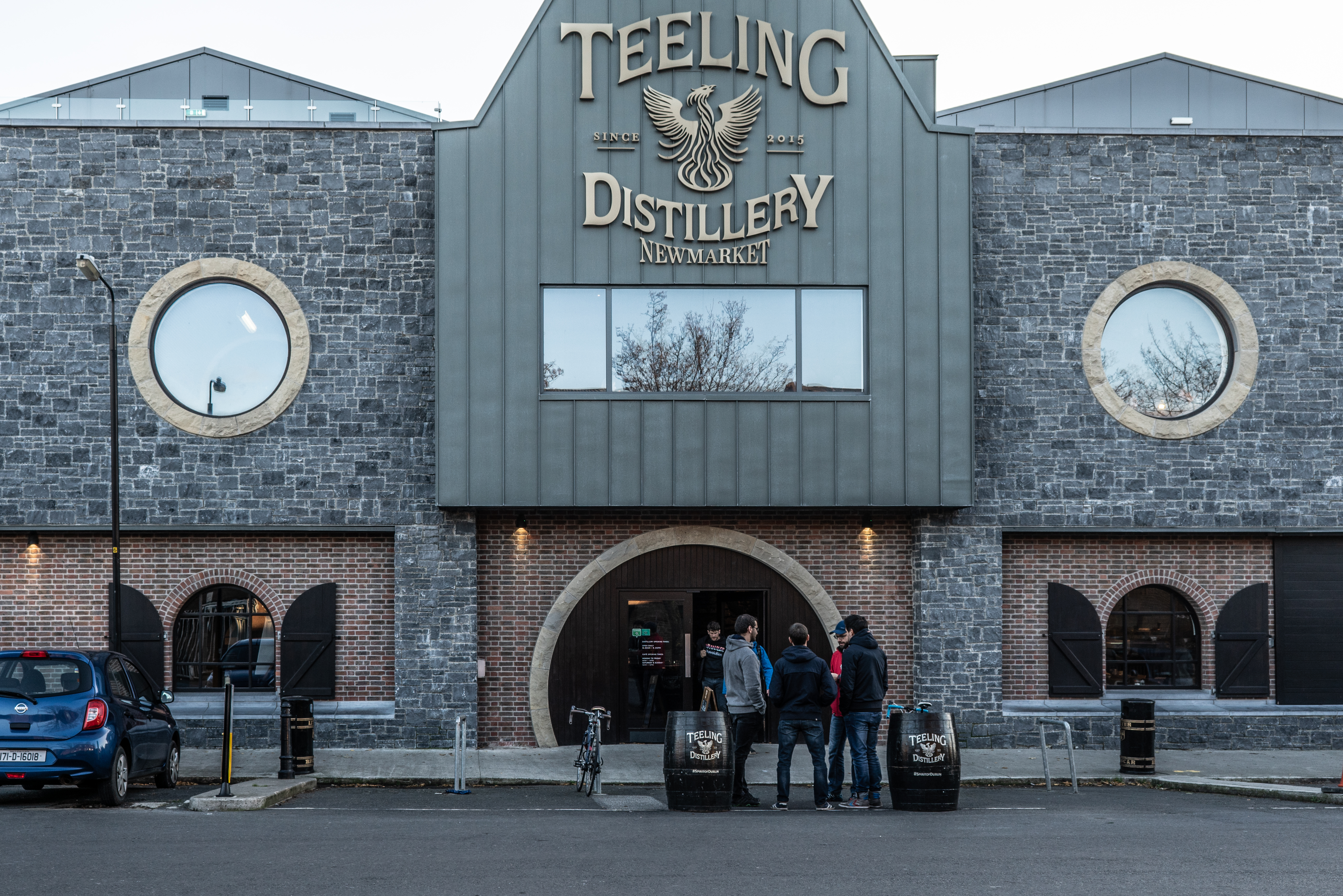
- Location: Blackpitts, Dublin, Ireland
- Owner: Bacardi Limited
- Founded: 2015
- Founder: Jack and Stephen Teeling
- Status: Operating
- No. of stills: 3 pot stills (15,000L wash still, 10,000L intermediate still and 9,000L spirit still)
- Capacity: 500,000 litres per year
- Website: www.teelingdistillery.com, www.teelingwhiskey.com

Teeling Small Batch
- Type: Irish whiskey
- ABV: 46%

Teeling Single Grain
- Type: Single Grain
- ABV: 46%

Teeling Single Malt
- Type: Single malt
- ABV: 46%

Teeling Spirit of Dublin
- Type: Poitin
- ABV: 50–52.5%

Teeling Distillery is an Irish whiskey distillery established in Dublin in 2015 by the Teeling Whiskey Company and owned by Bacardi Limited.

It is the first new whiskey distillery to have opened in Dublin, once a world whiskey distilling capital, in over 125 years. In fact, with the last of the original Dublin distilleries having closed in 1976, it is the first whiskey distillery to operate in Dublin, once home to at least 37 distilleries, in almost 40 years.

The distillery was established by Jack and Stephen Teeling, whose father John Teeling had founded the monopoly-breaking Cooley Distillery in 1987. It is located in the Liberties area of Dublin, close to where Walter Teeling, an ancestor of the family had established a distillery on Marrowbone Lane in 1782. The symbol of the brand, a phoenix rising from a pot still, symbolises the re-establishment of the Teeling whiskey brand.

== History ==
=== Ancestral activity ===
In 1782, Walter Teeling established a distillery on Dublin's Marrowbone Lane, in the Liberties area of Dublin, then an epicentre of distilling dubbed the "golden triangle" due to the number of distilleries located in the area. Although now long gone, some of the distilleries in the Liberties area at the time were very large operations, with George Roe's Thomas Street Distillery likely being the largest distillery in the world at its peak.

Eventually, the Teeling Distillery was purchased by a larger neighbouring operation, William Jameson & Co., which was also based on Marrowbone Street. However, William Jameson's distillery, run by relatives of the more famous John Jameson, later closed in 1923, having like many Irish distilleries, encountered serious financial difficulties in the early 20th century.

=== 20th century ===
In 1987, John Teeling, a descendant of Walter Teeling, purchased a facility in Cooley, County Louth which had previously been set up by the Irish Free State Government to produce industrial alcohol from potatoes. Teeling converted this plant to a whiskey distillery, reopening it in 1989 as Cooley Distillery. The distillery was the first new distillery to launch in Ireland following the consolidations and closures of the 20th century.

John Teeling's two sons, Jack and Stephen, worked with their father at Cooley Distillery when it was sold to Beam Inc. (now Suntory Global Spirits) in 2011. Jack, then managing director, left, while his brother stayed on for about a year.

As part of the sale, the Teelings negotiated the purchase of 16,000 casks of aged whiskey. Using these stocks, Jack Teeling launched Teeling Whiskey in 2012, and was later joined in the venture by his brother Stephen.

In 2015, the Teelings established a new whiskey distillery in Newmarket Square in Dublin's south inner city, not far from the location of the original Teeling Distillery on Marrowbone Lane. The distillery, which includes a visitor centre, café and shop, now employs some 55 staff, and exports to 44 countries.

In December 2023, Bacardi Limited took majority control of Teeling Distillery.

== Popular culture ==
Construction of the distillery was the subject of a four-part TV3 documentary, "Whiskey Business", which first aired in 2015.

== Bottlings ==
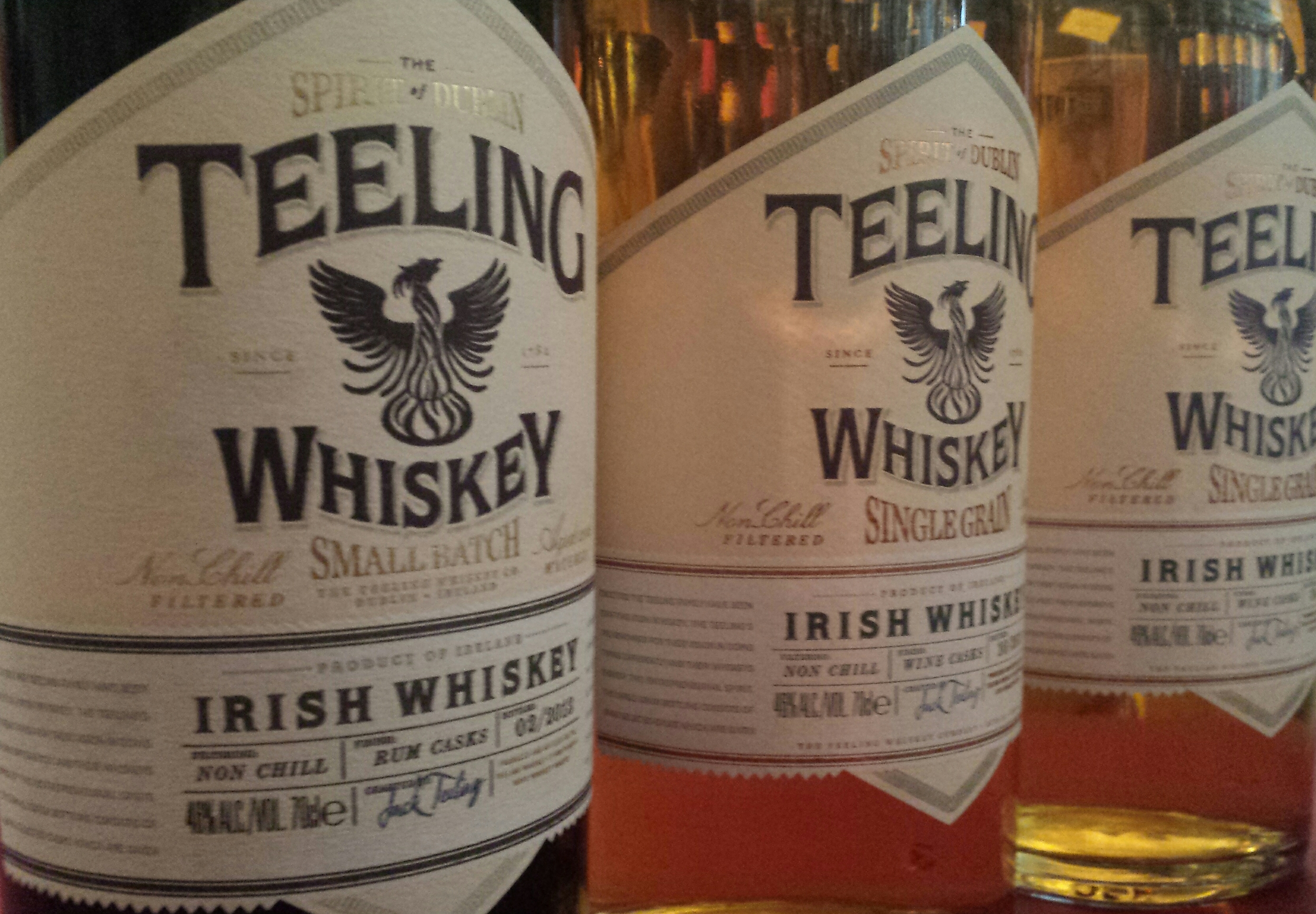
Bottles of Small Batch and Single Grain Teeling Irish Whiskey

To date, all Teeling whiskeys are 46% ABV and non-chill filtered. Several styles have been launched, including:

- Teeling Small Batch, finished in ex-Rum barrels
- Teeling Single Grain, matured in Californian cabernet sauvignon barrels
- Teeling Single Malt, vatted from whiskey finished in five different types of wine cask (Sherry, Port, Madeira, White Burgundy, Cabernet Sauvignon)
- Teeling Single Pot Still, produced from a mash bill of 50% malted and 50% unmalted barley, and aged for three years in ex-Muscat barrels
- Teeling The Revival 13-year-old, matured in ex-Bourbon casks for 12 years, and finished in an ex-Calvados cask for 1 year
- Teeling Vintage Reserve 24-year-old Single Malt
- Teeling Vintage Reserve 33-year-old Single Malt

In addition, a Poitín (a traditional Irish clear-spirit) has been launched:

- Teeling Spirit of Dublin Poitín, 50–52.5% ABV

== Accolades ==
The Teeling whiskeys have already been the recipients of several awards. At the 2016 World Whiskies Awards, awards included:

- Best Irish Single Malt - Teeling Whiskey 24 Year Old Single Malt
- Best Irish Single Malt (no age statement) - Teeling Single Malt
- Best Irish Single Grain - Teeling Single Grain
