= Liliana M. Dávalos =

Colombian-American evolutionary and conservation biologist

Liliana M. Dávalos is a Colombian-born evolutionary and conservation biologist, who is currently living in the United States. Her career as a researcher and professor have focused on bats as model systems and on tropical deforestation.

== Education ==
Dávalos graduated from the University of Valle, in Colombia, in 1997. In 2001 she was awarded an MA from Columbia University, Graduate School of Arts and Sciences in the Ecology and Evolution Biology program. She continued on at Columbia University to earn her PhD in 2004.

== Career ==
Dávalos has conducted research at a number of institutions, including her undergraduate work at the Universidad del Valle. Her post-doctoral work in the field of genomics was done at the American Museum of Natural History (AMNH), New York, and at the University of Arizona. Dávalos has been an assistant professor and lecturer at Columbia University, the Open University (Milton Keynes, United Kingdom), and Stony Brook University. In 2018, Dávalos secured the position of tenured professor at Stony Brook University, and has continued to maintained her connection to the AMNH as a Research Associate in the Division of Vertebrate Zoology.

In the course of her career, Dávalos has been bestowed with honors as a Fellow of the Kavli Frontiers of Science Symposium, and the National Academy of Sciences as an Education Fellow in the Life Sciences. Along with this recognition, she has been invited to speak at a number of institutions, including the American Museum of Natural History, Humboldt University of Berlin, ICESI Cali, the University of Basel, and her alma mater Columbia University.

== Research ==
Though Dávalos's breadth of work has included an array of fields, her primary research efforts focus on the evolution of physiological and molecular traits. Her work utilizes Neotropical bats as a model system for the development of molecular, morphological, and ecological characteristics. Other disciplines practiced by Dávalos include systematics, bioinformatics, geospatial analysis, and the assessment of conservation policy.

Notable works by Dávalos have included those on the evolution of frugivorous bats, which has helped illuminate the relationship between species diversification rates and novel morphological characteristics. Her attention to the analysis of methods has produced a substantive critique on the conflict of morphological and molecular tools for studying evolutionary processes, and demonstrated how common sampling bias can drastically affect conservation assessments. She has also performed numerous studies on how conflict and anti-narcotics policies impact deforestation in South America.

=== Grants and lines of inquiry ===
- Evolution of the longevity in bats (NSF)
- Chance or necessity? (frugivore and plant interactions) (NSF)
- Genomic sensory innovation in bats (NSF)
- Uncovering skin immune proteins as predictors of resistance to White Nose Syndrome (USFWS)
- Development of advanced spatial data analysis and visualization methods (NSF)

== Outreach and press ==
- From Fog of War to Flames of Peace—Wildfires Surge in Post-FARC Colombia
- El Estado Aplazado
- Humans Doomed Caribbean's 'Lost World' of Ancient Mammals
- Equilibrium A Distant Dream for Island Bats
- A New Family Tree For One Of The World's Most Endangered Mammals

== Publications ==
Dávalos has authored over 60 publications

- Armenteras, D., Schneider, L., & Dávalos, L. M. (2019). Fires in protected areas reveal unforeseen costs of Colombian peace. Nature ecology & evolution, 3(1), 20.
- Sadier, A., Davies, K. T., Yohe, L. R., Yun, K., Donat, P., Hedrick, B. P., ... & Sears, K. E. (2018). Multifactorial processes underlie parallel opsin loss in neotropical bats. eLife, 7, e37412.
- Dávalos, L. M., Lancaster, W. C., Núñez-Novas, M. S., León, Y. M., Lei, B., Flanders, J., & Russell, A. L. (2019). A coalescent-based estimator of genetic drift, and acoustic divergence in the Pteronotus parnellii species complex. Heredity, 122(4), 417.
- Tavares, V. D. C., Warsi, O. M., Balseiro, F., Mancina, C. A., & Dávalos, L. M. (2018). Out of the Antilles: Fossil phylogenies support reverse colonization of bats to South America. Journal of biogeography, 45(4), 859–873.
- Rojas, D., Ramos Pereira, M. J., Fonseca, C., & Dávalos, L. M. (2018). Eating down the food chain: generalism is not an evolutionary dead end for herbivores. Ecology Letters, 21(3), 402–410.
- Yohe, L. R., Liu, L., Dávalos, L. M., & Liberles, D. A. (2019). Protocols for the Molecular Evolutionary Analysis of Membrane Protein Gene Duplicates. In Computational Methods in Protein Evolution (pp. 49–62). Humana Press, New York, NY.
- Alvarez, M. D. (2001). Could peace be worse than war for Colombia's forests?. Environmentalist, 21(4), 305–315.
