= All Saints Church, Odiham =

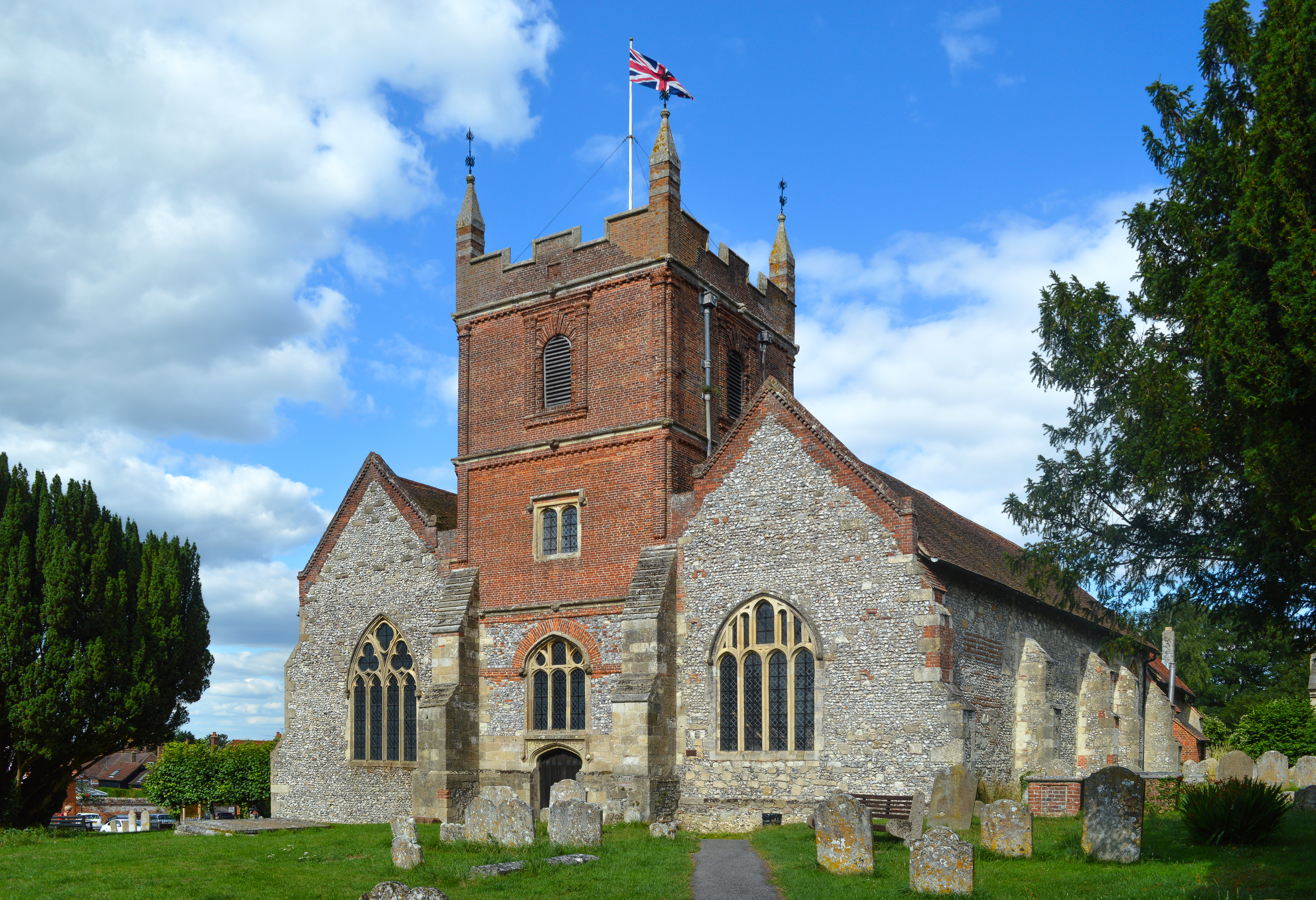
- All Saints Church, Odiham from the northeast
- All Saints Church, Odiham
- 51.252678°N 0.940485°W
- OS grid reference: SU 74039 50923
- Location: Odiham, Hampshire
- Country: England
- Denomination: Anglican
- Website: allsaintsodiham.org.uk

Architecture
- Heritage designation: Grade I
- Designated: 24 November 1961
- Architectural type: Church
- Style: Gothic and Tudor

All Saints Church is an Anglican church in the village of Odiham, Hampshire. It is situated near to Odiham's high street, 10 miles (15.2 km) away from Basingstoke. English Heritage has designated the church as a Grade I listed building.

== History and architecture ==
By the 11th century there was a church on this site, as recorded in the Domesday Book. The oldest visible parts of the present church are the chancel and the base of the tower, dating from the early 13th century. Between the chancel and tower, the nave has been altered and extended into side aisles, in two stages, and the upper parts of the tower completely rebuilt in the 17th century.

The present church has a nave with gabled aisles of similar height, which extend to flank the western tower. The chancel projects to the east, and is flanked with gabled chapels. The walls are of flint with some rubble included, with the later parts, including the upper stages of the tower, being red brick. The roof is of tiles.

=== Exterior ===
Externally, there are seven buttresses down each side, framing windows of different dates and with tracery in different styles, both Decorated and Perpendicular Gothic as typified in the large windows of the west ends of the aisles, being Decorated on the north side and Perpendicular on the south. See image above. There is a gabled porch on the north side sheltering a doorway with a depressed arch into the north aisle.

The tower, which has 13th-century foundations of flint and rubble has been rebuilt above the level of the eaves in red brick in the mid 17th century. At the lower level is the western portal with a depressed Tudor arch, recently restored, above which rises a traceried window framed by a brick course. The tower rises in two stages, the first having a square-topped mullioned window in the Tudor style. The belfry level has a large rounded-headed opening with Classical details, including rusticated voussoirs, Ionic pilasters and a brick entablature. The tower is topped by a crenelated parapet, and pinnacles in the Tudor style dating from the 19th century. The tower holds a ring of six bells dating from 1614.

=== Interior ===
The nave is divided from the aisles by arcades of different dates and styles. The arcade on the south side dates from the 13th century and has four bays and clustered columns with delicate shafts. The arcade on the north has three wider arches supported by octagonal columns of the 14th century. The chancel, which dates mainly to the early 13th century, is separated from the nave by a chancel arch and is of two bays. It opens on either side into a chapel, the arches supported on piers with stout attached semi-columns.

The church contains a font from about 1500 and a number of wooden fittings from the 17th century including the pulpit, and galleries at the ends of each aisle adjacent to the tower which were installed in 1632. In 2010 the design of these galleries was reproduced in the building of a gallery at the end of the nave to support the new organ. The organ, which was installed in 2011, is modelled on 18th-century examples.

The chancel contains a three-light window with late 20th-century glass by Patrick Reyntiens depicting the Adoration of the Lamb. Other windows contain 19th- and 20th-century stained glass by Hardman of Birmingham, Burlison and Grylls, George Farmiloe and Caroline Benyon.

== Ministry ==
The Church is open 9-5pm daily and offers three Sunday services (traditional worship at 9.30am, informal family worship with Children's Church at 11am and evensong once a month). The Vicar is Rev'd Chris Dudgeon.

The church works closely with the village and surrounding community, offering a foodbank, homegroups, pastoral care and many children's activities such as holiday clubs and after school clubs as well as free community events. The Church also has links to Mothers Union, Christian Aid and other Christian organisations and partnerships. The Friends of All Saints' Church Odiham provides financial aid to assist in the care and maintenance of the church and its churchyard.

=== Music ===
All Saints' has a robed choir of about 40 children, youth and adults, that sings on Sundays, as well as giving performances. They are affiliated with the Royal School of Church Music and all junior choristers follow the "Voice for Life" training programme. The current director of music is Alex Hodgkinson.

==== Organ ====
The current organ was the brainchild of Ian Ledsham, who became organist of All Saints' in 2000 and died suddenly in 2005 before the project could be realised. A successful project, run by Tim Paton, saw the building of the organ and its dedication on 25 September 2011 as the Ledsham Memorial Organ.

The organ was built by Martin Goetze and Dominic Gwynn, and was based on the 18th-century organs of English builders such as Bernard Smith. The design of the case was based in part on the case of an organ formerly in Lincoln Cathedral and dating from 1662. It has carved details by Nick Hunter, based on the organ at Framlingham, Suffolk, and other Renaissance examples. A gallery was built at the west end of the nave to accommodate the organ, and is constructed of steel girders with a wooden gallery front like the 17th-century galleries to either side of it. The organ case is of oak, with pine for the rear case, swell and wooden pipes. The keyboards are by Verners Kalacis of Latvia. The single-fold bellows for the great and swell are arranged vertically with a pressure of 63mm. The bellows for the pedal have a pressure of 75mm. The temperament is mildly unequal and the voicing is derived from the later instruments of Father Smith.

==== Bells ====
All Saints Odiham Bellringers are closely involved with the church.
