= Ursuline College Sligo =

Location
- Finisklin Road; Sligo, F91 FW54, County Sligo; Ireland

Information
- Type: Voluntary secondary school
- Religious affiliation: Roman Catholic
- Principal: Colm McIntyre
- Gender: Female
- Enrollment: 707
- Colour
- Website: ursulinecollegesligo.ie

Ursuline College Sligo is an all-girls Catholic voluntary Secondary School (state school) in Sligo. It is under the trusteeship of the Le Cheile Schools Trust.

== History ==
The school traces its origins to 1850 when members of the order of Ursulines came to Sligo. The following year they established ‘’Nazareth’’, a free primary school. From this grew St. Joseph's National School and St. Vincent's Secondary School which became the Ursuline Convent.

== Alumni ==
- Mary Coughlan (b. 1965) - politician
- Emma Hansberry (b. 1994) - footballer and coach, Sligo Rovers F.C. (women)
