= Robert May's School =

Coordinates: 51.253°N 0.952°W

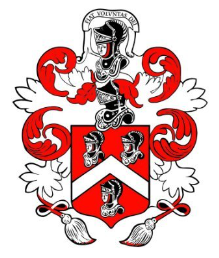

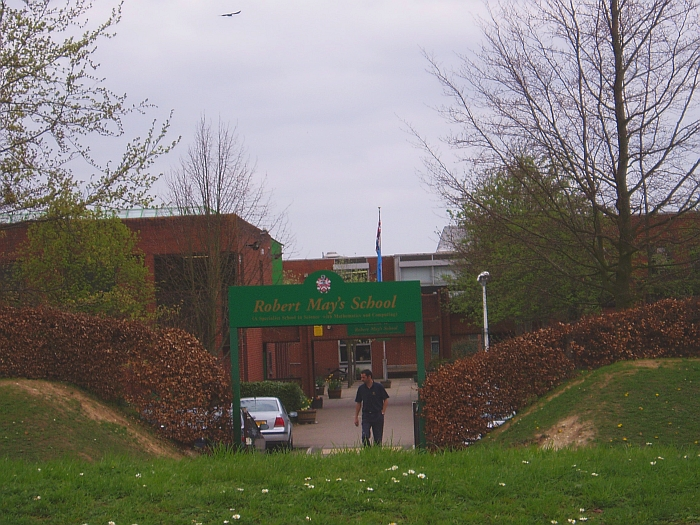
- Odiham, Hampshire, RG29 1NA; England

Information
- Type: Academy
- Motto: Latin: Fiat Voluntas Dei; May God's will be done
- Established: 1694; 332 years ago
- Founder: Robert May
- Department for Education URN: 138135 Tables
- Ofsted: Reports
- Chair of Governors: Caroline Oppenheimer
- Headteacher: Rea Mitchell
- Gender: Coeducational
- Age: 11 to 16
- Enrolment: 1,224
- Website: http://www.rmays.org

Robert May's School is a coeducational secondary school with academy status, located in the village of Odiham, Hampshire, England. All children in year 6 whose families live in the catchment area, and who attend named feeder schools in the area are eligible for a place at the school in year 7. The school was founded in 1694 with donations from the will of Robert May, a local man, and other benefactors who contributed to what is now the Odiham Consolidated Charities.

== History ==
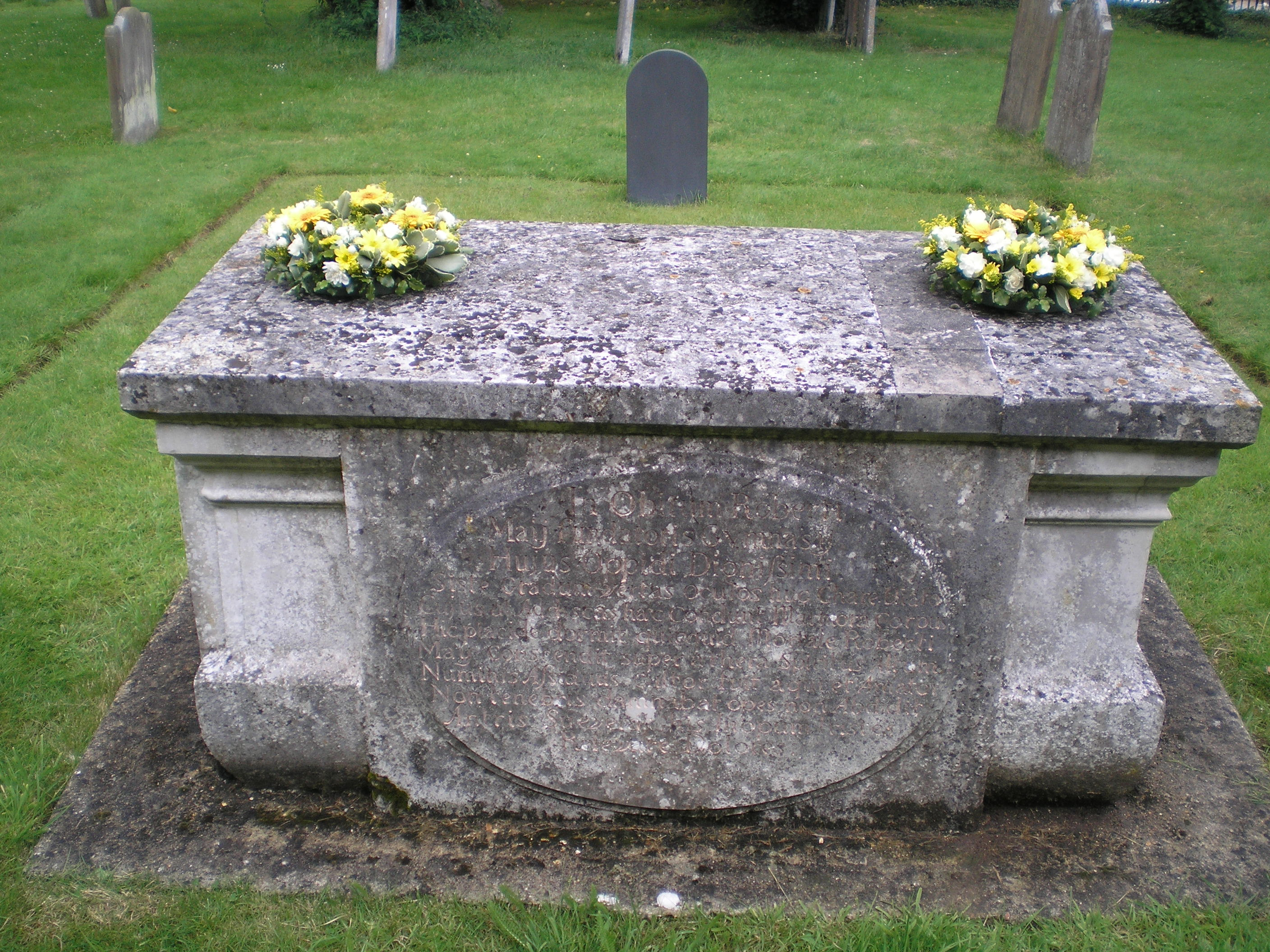
Grave of Robert May, original founder of the school

The original school was founded in 1694 from donations made in the will of Robert May, a local mercer, and the first school premises were purchased ten years later. This donation was supplemented by a gift from James Zouch, a trustee appointed in the will of Robert May, enabling twenty-five boys to be taught at the school. In addition to the main school, the headmaster was allowed to take boarding pupils of wealthy parents and give them a classical education. This resulted in the headmaster giving little attention to the needs of the main school and the school Trustees passed a resolution in 1858 requiring the headmaster to spend more time with the main school.

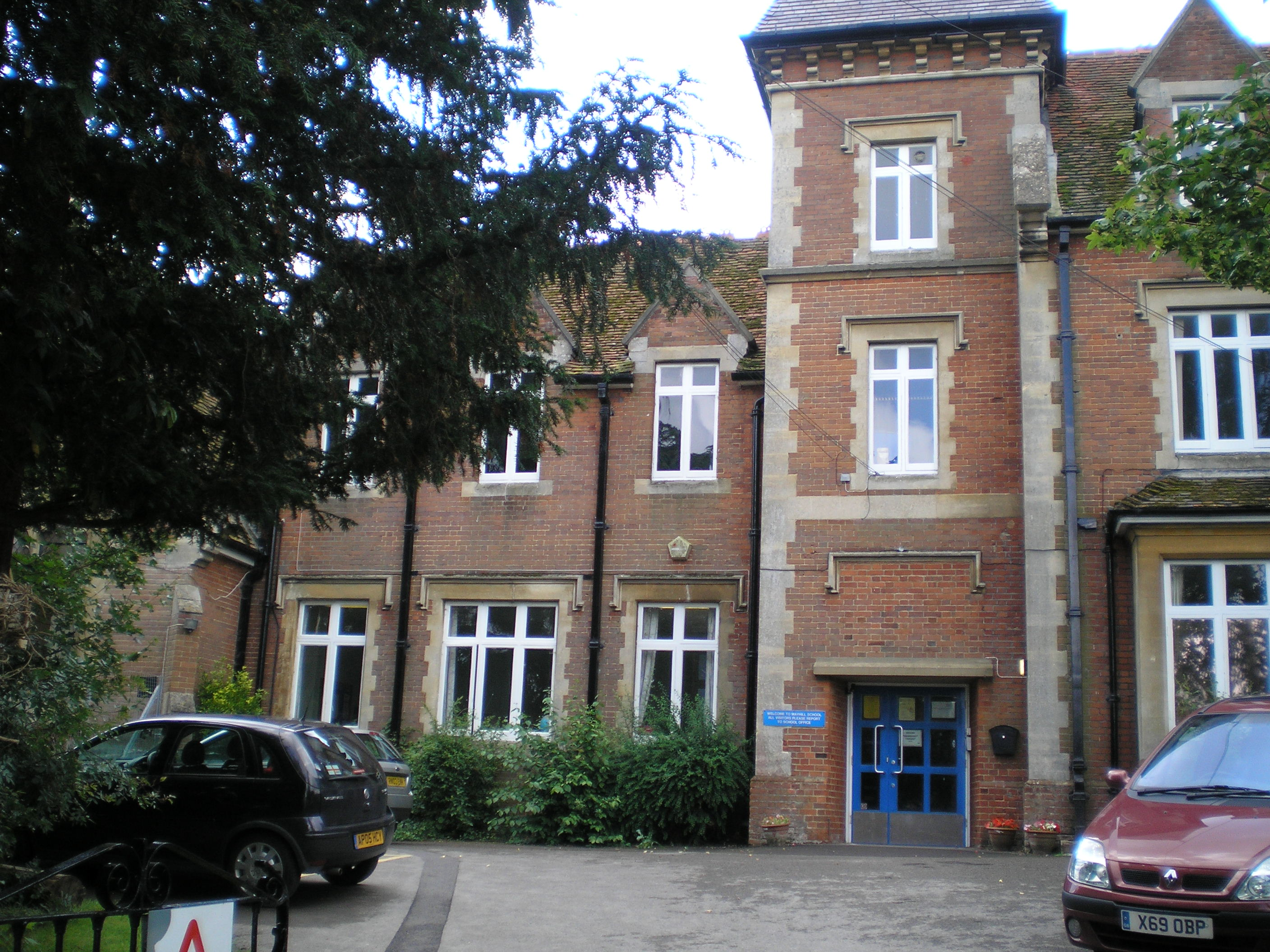
Old school building, constructed 1876

The school was reorganised in the 1870s, following the Endowed Schools Act 1869.

The group of Trustees that had run the school since its foundation was replaced by a board of governors. Pupils were now required to pay fees to attend the school and a new building was constructed, opening in 1876. This building is still in use as part of a local junior school.

In 1920, the local education authority decreed that teachers' salaries should be increased and the director of education wrote to the governors saying that he could not afford the ever-increasing financial support to the school. Following a report by an inspector later in the year that the school could soon face difficulties, the decision was taken to transfer complete control of the school to the county.

The start of the Second World War in September 1939 resulted in air raid shelters being dug, delaying the start of term. During the war, the school day had to end earlier, due to the blackout, and a total of 151 air raid warnings were sounded in the first year alone. An enemy bomb landed close to the school in 1940 but no-one was hurt.

The grammar school was closed down in 1950, despite vigorous local protests and a petition to the government carrying 1,000 signatures. Funding for building work on the school site was approved in 1952 and was completed in 1957, when the school was reopened as a secondary modern school with 265 pupils. A formal opening ceremony took place in 1958.

The school was reorganised again in the 1970s into a comprehensive school, with new school buildings constructed by 1975. The new site was designed for 690 pupils and had a central courtyard, concert hall, office, dining area and kitchen, with separate blocks for craft workshops and music. In the first year the new school took in five hundred and three pupils. More buildings were constructed in 1978, linked to the rest of the building by walkways. More business studies and computer facilities, as well as a new library, were added in 1987. The music block was rebuilt in 1993/94. A new English block followed soon after, as did a new maths block in 2002, in order to allow the school to cope with its high intake. Following a successful application, the school then became a Specialist School in Science with mathematics and computing. In 2019, the school finished construction on the new "Invictus" block.

The school converted to academy status on 1 May 2012.

== Demographics ==
Pupils come from the surrounding area, including the villages of Upton Grey, Greywell, Hook, Hartley Wintney and Odiham. The vast majority of pupils are of white ethnicity and British backgrounds and there are a few pupils who speak English as a second language. The number of pupils eligible for free school meals or who have disabilities is below average.

== Extra-curricular activities ==
A wide range of free extracurricular activities are run after school hours on five days of the week, with special buses for pupils involved to return home afterwards. The choice available has been described as "exceptional" by a school inspection.

From year 7 onwards, students can take part in exchange trips with partner schools in France and Germany, as well as other trips to ski resorts and residential trips such as recent trips to Iceland and Tanzania.

Robert May's School has competed in the F1 in Schools competition annually for over a decade - Colossus F1 were crowned World Champions in 2014, with Britannia Red being crowned World Champions for the 2020(21) competition. Other successful teams include Rush, Evolution, Enigma, and Origin who have all represented the United Kingdom at the World Finals.

The school has run stage productions since 1921 and almost annually since 1977. The most recent productions were "Beauty and the Beast" (2018), "School of Rock" (2019), and "Annie" (2021).

== Notable former pupils ==
- George Isaac Huntingford, Bishop of Gloucester (1802–1815), Bishop of Hereford (1815–1832).
- Thomas Burgess, Bishop of Saint David's (1803–1825), Bishop of Salisbury (1825–1837).
- William Addison, awarded the Victoria Cross in the First World War.
- Brigadier Manley Angell James, awarded the Victoria Cross in the First World War.
- Justin Rose, major Golf champion and Olympic gold medallist at Rio 2016 in the Men's Golf . Though his attendance was erratic, he gained eight good GCSEs and the staff encouraged him in his sporting ambitions.
- Robert Tobin, Olympic bronze medal runner for Team GB.
- Ranil Jayawardena, Member of Parliament for North East Hampshire from 2015 to 2024. Briefly Secretary of State for Environment, Food and Rural Affairs under Liz Truss in 2022.
- Olly Lancashire, a professional footballer.
