= Evelyn Owens =

Irish politician and trade union activist (1931–2010)

- Owens in 1969

Senator
- In office 5 November 1969 – 27 October 1977
- Constituency: Labour Panel

Personal details
- Born: 22 January 1931 Clontarf, Dublin, Ireland
- Died: 26 September 2010 (aged 79) Dublin, Ireland
- Party: Labour Party
- Education: Trinity College Dublin

Evelyn Perpetua Owens (22 January 1931 – 26 September 2010) was an Irish Labour Party politician and trade union activist.

Evelyn Owens was a pioneering advocate for women’s rights and industrial relations in Ireland. Her frustration with gender-based pay disparity in Dublin Corporation led her to champion equal pay, joining the Irish Local Government Officials' Union (ILGOU) and securing equal pay rates for women in the 1960s. Owens became the first female president of ILGOU and used her position in Seanad Éireann (1969–1977) to push for equal pay and women’s rights. During her tenure in the Seanad, Owens became the first woman to hold the office of Leas-Chathaoirleach.

Owens continued to make a significant impact as chair of the Labour Court from 1994, advancing gender equality and securing key rulings on sexual harassment and discrimination. Her mediation helped avert a national nurses' strike in 1997 and contributed to major reforms, including the introduction of the minimum wage in 2001.

== Early life ==
Evelyn Perpetua Owens was born in the Dublin suburb of Clontarf, the fourth of six children in a civil-servant family of William Owens, from County Roscommon, and Ellen (née Monaghan), from County Galway. She grew up partly in Limerick but mostly in Clontarf, and, following secondary education at Holy Faith Secondary School, Clontarf, began work for Dublin Corporation in the city treasurer's department. While working, she studied for a diploma in public administration, during evenings, at Trinity College Dublin. The choice to attend Trinity required formal "permission" from her parish priest, reflecting the era’s religious strictures on women’s higher education.

== Career ==
While progressing in the Corporation, Owens became frustrated by the pay disparity between male and female employees doing the same job. This issue led her to make equal pay her cause and become active in the Irish Local Government Officials' Union (ILGOU) (now part of Fórsa). In 1959, she joined a group of women within the union who were angered by its 1963 acceptance of a discriminatory clerical pay award. As chair of the newly formed Association of Women Officers of the Local Authorities of Ireland, Owens led a successful campaign to secure equal pay rates for women, marking one of the first significant advances for women’s rights in Ireland since the 1930s.

Although Owen's association with the women officers lapsed, Owens emerged as a radical force within the ILGOU, championing female recruitment, forging ties with blue-collar unions, and advocating for neglected female grades such as clerk typists. Elected vice-president (1964–67) and then president (1967–69), she became the first woman to lead an Irish trade union representing both sexes. She was a member of the public services committee of the Irish Congress of Trade Unions (ICTU), chairperson of its women's advisory committee and a member of the Council for the Status of Women.

In 1967, with Helen Burke, Owens founded the Association of Women Citizens to press for equal pay and employment; the group rallied 1,000 members but struggled to persuade factory workers who feared job losses. From 1968 to 1971, Owens chaired the ICTU’s Women’s Advisory Council. Frustrated by its token equal-pay stance and by women’s general reluctance to join unions, Owens warned that their shunning of union activism weakened the cause.

=== Electoral politics ===
Owens joined the Labour Party and was elected to Seanad Éireann on the Labour Panel at the 1969 Seanad election; she was re-elected in 1973. She used her Seanad platform to champion equal pay, co-education and the rights of abandoned wives, distressed widows and single mothers. Impeccably turned out and business-like in manner, she won the respect of her overwhelmingly male colleagues. Throughout, she retained her post with Dublin Corporation, which allowed her leave to attend Senate meetings. She also sat on the Council for the Status of Women in the early 1970s and chaired Labour’s Women’s National Council from 1975. Although firmly on the liberal wing of Labour, Owens upheld party discipline, distinguishing herself from the more outspoken feminist activists of the period; she framed her arguments in class terms and later remarked that feminism had achieved little for working mothers.

Following her 1973 re-election, Owens was appointed Leas-Chathaoirleach (deputy speaker) of the Seanad, becoming the first woman to hold the post. She frequently presided over Seanad business during the absence of Cathaoirleach James Dooge. As a member of the Presidential Commission, she made history in 1974 as the first woman to sign an Irish bill into law. Between 1973 and 1977, she played a key role in ending overt pay and employment discrimination; she was prominent in protests against the government’s attempts to delay implementing equal pay legislation and steered the Employment Equality Act through the Seanad shortly before the coalition’s fall. Despite her achievements, Owens lost her seat at the 1977 election; her distaste for the gruelling process of canvassing nationwide is often cited as a factor.

=== Continued trade unionism ===
After securing a management post in Dublin Corporation overseeing labour relations, Owens remained a steadfast trade union representative for Corporation workers and an active Labour Party member; she served on the party’s national executive and was closely associated with Frank Cluskey, Labour leader from 1977 to 1981. Her former Oireachtas membership granted her access to the Dáil bar and its political networks, which proved advantageous in 1984 when Minister for Labour Ruairí Quinn appointed her vice-chairwoman of the Labour Court.

At the Labour Court, Owens championed women’s rights; although the court was primarily an industrial tribunal, it had authority over employment equality issues. Her impact was immediate; in 1985 the court issued a landmark ruling recognising the right to freedom from sexual harassment at work. The court’s evolving case law on gender discrimination and harassment would later underpin major equality legislation passed by the Oireachtas in 1998.

At Irish Congress of Trade Unions’s request, Minister for Enterprise and Employment Ruairí Quinn promoted Owens to chairwoman of the Labour Court in 1994. Thrust into a series of high-profile industrial disputes, she managed the media adroitly and won praise for crafting compromises; however, her successor later suggested she overlooked financial sustainability in pursuit of settlements.

Owens inherited a fraught relationship with the Labour Relations Commission (LRC), which had assumed the Labour Court’s conciliation role in 1991; while acknowledging tensions, she insisted they were overstated. In 1996 she rejected proposals to make Labour Court recommendations binding, defending the principle of voluntary collective bargaining. Persistent employer and union rejection of court recommendations in favour of LRC conciliation eroded the Labour Court’s status as the final arbiter.

Industrial relations professionals on both sides of the table viewed her as a fair, competent, and effective chair. She faced substantial challenges during significant strikes at Irish Steel, Team Aer Lingus, and Packard Electric in 1994, as well as at Dunnes Stores and Irish Press Newspapers in 1995.

During the economic boom of the Celtic tiger era, Owens helped avert a national nurses' strike in spring 1997 by brokering a generous pay deal. Though intended to be an isolated case, her intervention triggered a wave of claims from other health-sector unions, undermining the government's pay policy and provoking resentment among excluded groups. Equality and sexual harassment cases increasingly dominated the Labour Court’s work; in late 1997, it awarded €100,000 each to four women employed by the Irish Aviation Authority after ruling that male colleagues with no greater responsibilities had been paid more. The case challenged entrenched public-sector practices of salary protection for redeployed male staff.

Owens chaired the National Minimum Wage Commission (1997–8), which laid the groundwork for the introduction of a minimum wage in 2001, as well as the committee that founded the National Centre for Partnership and Performance (1997–2001).

=== Later years ===
After her retirement in 1998, she served as a member of the board of Beaumont Hospital and of the Medical Council of Ireland.

== Personal life ==
Owens never married. Owens loved to travel and visited most parts of the globe except the Far East; notable journeys included trips to Alaska, Peru and the Middle East. Her principal travelling companion was her former Dublin Corporation colleague Kay Heffernan, whose death in later years was a great personal blow to Owens.

Owens died in Dublin on 26 September 2010.
