= STEM Racing =

School STEM competition endorsed by Formula 1

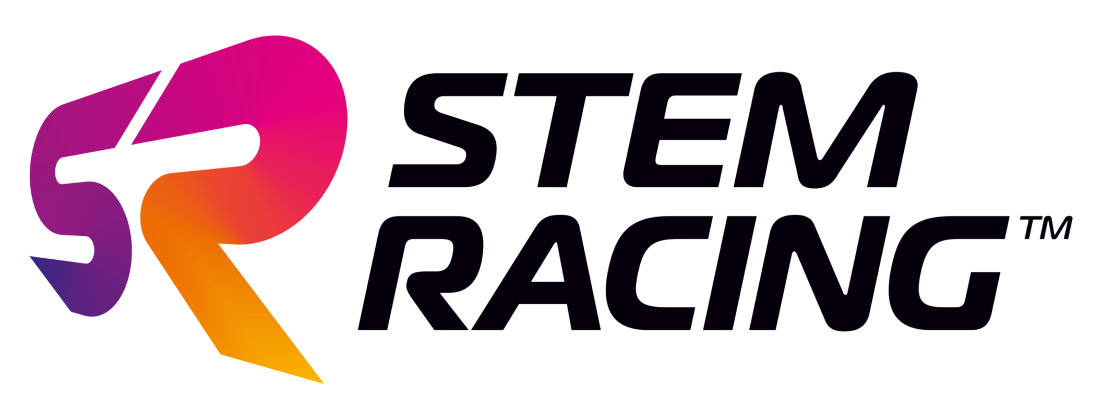
- Formerly: Jaguar F1 Team in Schools (2001-2005), F1 in Schools (2006-2024)
- Founded: 1999; 27 years ago
- Founder: Andrew Denford
- First season: 2001
- No. of teams: 91 Teams at the 2026 STEM Racing World Finals
- Headquarters: Brighouse, United Kingdom
- Most recent champion: (Saudi Arabia) Lynx (2026 World Champions)
- Most titles: Australia (8 World Championships)
- Website: stemracing.com

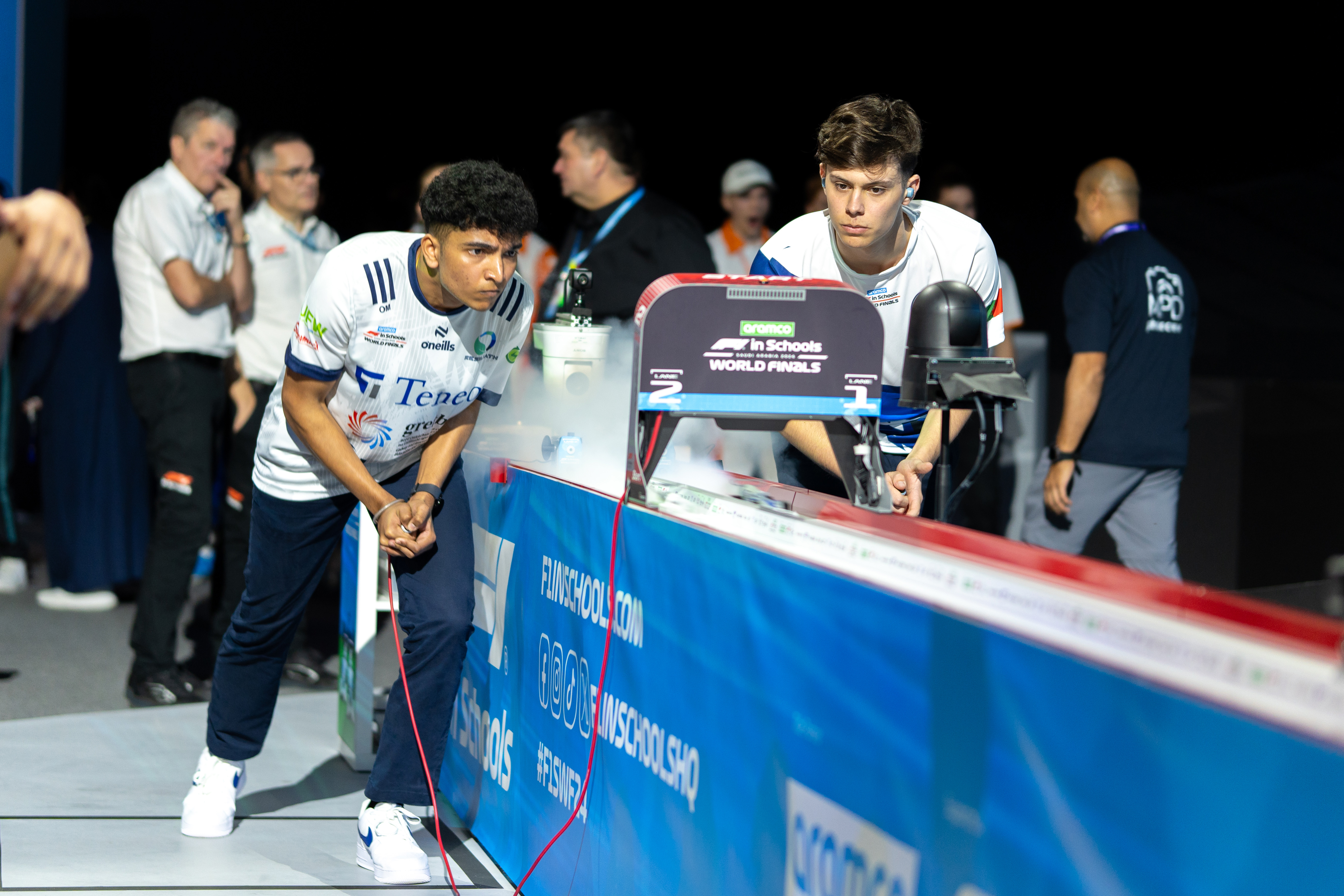
F1 in Schools racing at 2024 World Finals

STEM Racing (formerly F1 in Schools) is an international STEM competition endorsed by Formula 1 for secondary school students.

Groups of 3–6 students have to design and manufacture a miniature F1 car using CAD/CAM and CAE design tools. The cars are powered by CO_{2} cartridges and are attached to a track by a nylon wire. They are timed from the moment they are launched to when they pass the finish line.

The cars have to follow extensive regulations, in a similar fashion to Formula 1 (e.g. the wheels of the car must be in contact with the track at all times). The cars are raced on a 20m long track with four lanes (in the Aramco STEM Racing World Finals, generally 2 lanes), to allow two to four cars to be raced simultaneously. CFD software called F1 Virtual Wind Tunnel was designed by Denford Ltd., who are also the organisers and founders of STEM Racing specifically for the challenge, although teams mostly tend to use other packages such as the Ansys Workbench or Autodesk Simulation suites.

As of 2008 the competition was operational in over 40 countries. The competition was first introduced in the UK in 1999. The competition's aim is to introduce younger people to engineering in a fun environment. The competition is held annually, with Regional and National Finals. The overall winners of the National Finals are invited to compete at the World Finals, which are held at a different location each year, usually held in conjunction with a Formula One Grand Prix. In the UK competition there are 3 classes of entry: Professional Class aimed at 11- to 19-year-olds; Development Class aimed at 11- to 19-year-olds in their first year; and Entry Class aimed at 11- to 14-year-olds. As of October 2025, the STEM Racing World Champions are Lunar from Brighton Grammar School in Australia.

The STEM Racing World Record was set in 2016 by the Australian team Infinitude and is 0.916 seconds.

After safety issues concerning the use of extended canister chambers coupled with the Launch Energy Recovery System (LERS), the controversial device was banned globally from the 2017 World Finals season onwards, after being innovated in 2014 by Colossus F1.

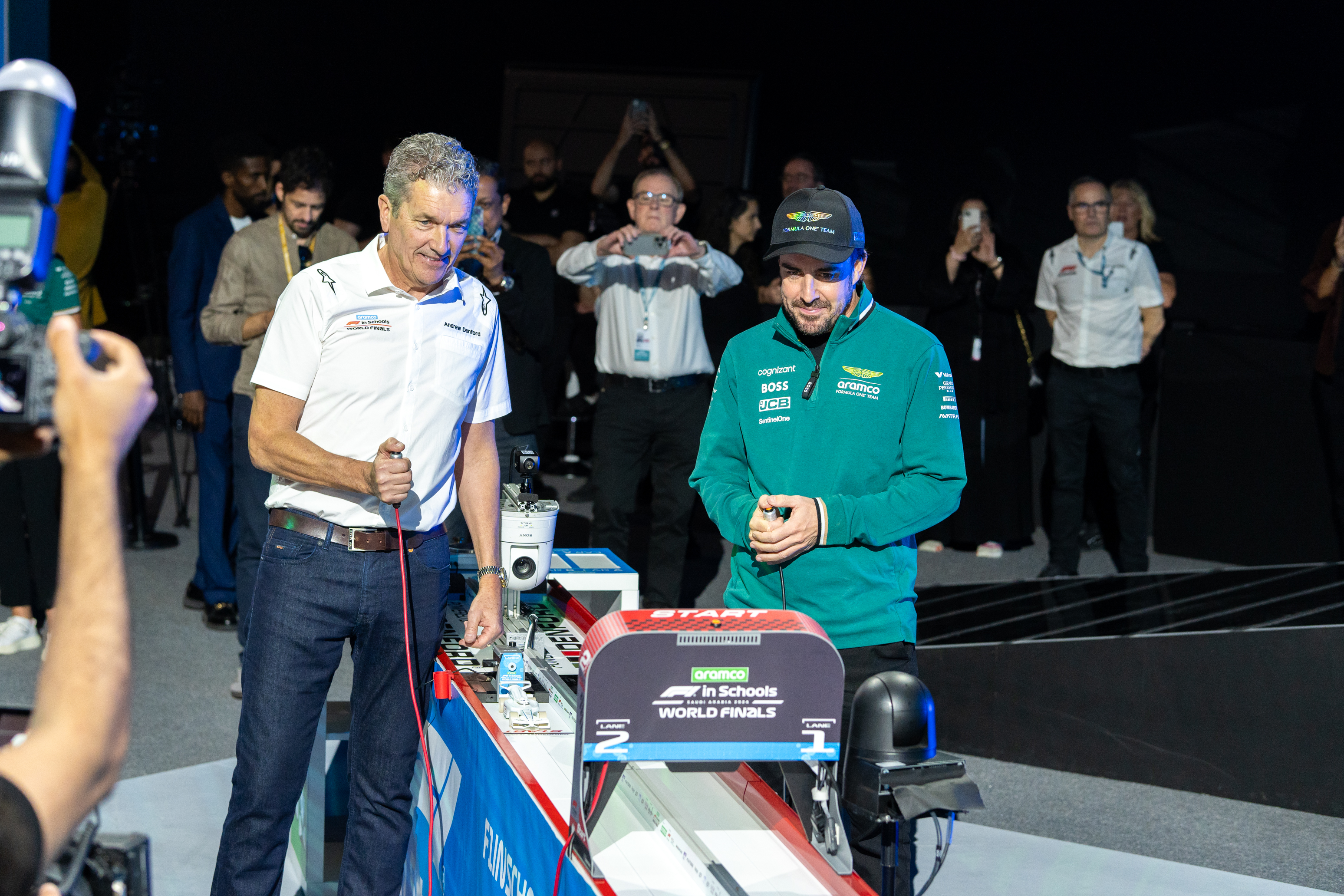
Fernando Alonso takes part in a race at the 2024 F1 in Schools World Finals

Denford Ltd. unveiled a new track and timing system that debuted at the 2017 World Finals. All components are manufactured in-house, at lower cost than the previous Pitsco-produced track. The track's launching mechanism has had numerous reliability issues since its introduction.

In 2018, the competition's logo was updated to incorporate Formula One's updated logo, and the Bernie Ecclestone World Champions trophy was replaced with a new trophy incorporating the new logo and the car of the 2017 World Champions, Hyperdrive.

The 2020 F1 in Schools World Finals was postponed twice due to the effects of the COVID-19 pandemic. The World Finals 2020–21 was held as a virtual event in the UK in June 2021, with 43 competing teams.

In 2024, Formula 1 announced that the competition would be rebranded from F1 in Schools to STEM Racing.

== Aspects of the competition ==
Specifications judging Specifications judging is a detailed inspection process where the race car is assessed for compliance with the STEM Racing Technical Regulations. Scrutineering is conducted within the confines of parc fermé, where judges use a series of specially manufactured gauges and accurate measuring tools to check cars' compliance.

All of the rules and regulations season can be found at the STEM Racing website.

Engineering judging The scheduled engineering judging interview session focuses on the application of CAD/CAM analysis, CAD data organisation, orthographic drawing, 3D render and use of CNC machining. This is an informal interview where judges ask the team to demonstrate their CAD / CAM work and query teams on what they have done.

Portfolio and pit display judging

Each team of students is required to produce an enterprise portfolio, engineering portfolio, project management portfolio, as well as a pit display. The portfolios are A3 size and should contain information about the team, their car design and manufacturing process, marketing techniques, project management, teamwork and team identity. Teams are given an area to set up a pit display which is judged alongside their design portfolio by a panel of judges.

Verbal presentation judging In advance of the competition, teams prepare a timed verbal presentation to present to a panel of judges, outlining their project. Teams usually use a PowerPoint presentation/Canva Presentation as a visual aid when presenting to the judges. The length of the verbal presentation varies depending on the level of the competition. At World Finals Level teams are required to prepare a 10-minute presentation.

Racing

Teams race their cars against each other on the 20-metre STEM Racing competition track. Points are awarded for reaction time racing as well as knockout racing.

== Defining car features ==
Regulations vary from regional to national to world finals, but the basic features, resembling a real F1 car, are consistent.

Front and rear wing

The cars have to include a front wing that does not cover the wheels if seen from the side or the top in the technical drawing. The front wing can not cover the wheels higher than 15 mm relative to the track surface and must not be physically obstructed by any other components of the car. The minimum wingspan of the front wing is 50 mm and its thickness should be between 2 mm and 6 mm. To allow for airflow, the front wing must have at least 5 mm of clear air space to any other part of the car or track surface.

The rear wing cannot cover the rear wheels if seen from above and must not be physically obstructed by any other component when viewed from the front. The rear wing must have a single, unbroken minimum span of 50 mm and a thickness between 2 mm to 6 mm. Similar to the front wing, to allow for airflow the rear wing must have a minimum of 5 mm clear air space to any other part of the car or track surface.

Cartridge chamber

The cars feature a chamber to hold the CO_{2} cartridge. It has to be parallel to the track surface. There are many other safety regulations regarding this, for example how far out it can protrude.

Wheels

The cars have to include four wheels with a given scope of width and radius that are in contact with the surface of the track at all times. The wheels must be entirely visible from the right or left side and from the top. There is a 15 mm long exclusion zone behind the width of the front wheels.

Halo

The STEM Racing regulations later included an additional structure known as the "Halo", a standard structure across all STEM Racing Cars in the World Finals, introduced into the Indian and Australian National Finals in 2025. The Halo is the New Standard Deceleration system, which uses a rubber band to catch the car after the finish line

Car body

The cars have to incorporate a virtual cargo horizontal to the track surface in between the centre of the axis of the wheels. This renders many "catamaran" designs insufficient. Cars have to be symmetrical to a vertically oriented reference plane. Cars also feature side boxes large enough to hold the STEM Racing decal. In 2025, a "Legal Ballast", a cavity under the Halo assembly has been allowed, which can be used for weight reduction, or to house fishing weights to increase the car to the absolute minimum weight of 48g.

== STEM Racing World Finals results ==
Generally, Regional/State Champions are invited to compete at their country's National Finals, with the in-country organising authority inviting other teams to the National Finals through the use of wildcards. The National Champions are invited to represent their country at the World Finals. The winning team receives the STEM Racing World Championship Trophy. The World Finals podium places and Best Engineered Car are outlined below.

Venue	World Champions	Second place	Third Place	Best Engineered Car
2004 (United Kingdom) Coventry	(United States) Turbo; Bloomsburg High School (PA)	(South Africa) Flash; St Alban's College	(Australia) Thunder Down Under; Cheltenham Girls High School (NSW) & Noosa District State High (QLD)	(Australia) Thunder Down Under; Cheltenham Girls High (NSW) & Noosa District State High School (QLD)
2006 (United Kingdom) Birmingham	(Australia) Stingers; Trinity Grammar School	(South Africa) Flash; St Alban's College	(United States) Turbo; Bloomsburg High School (PA)	(Australia) Stingers; Trinity Grammar School
2007 (Australia) Melbourne	(Northern Ireland) FUGA; Coleraine Academical Institution	(Scotland) Lighting; Blairgowrie High School	(Malaysia) Mercurial Ace; SMK Convent Bukit Nanas	(Australia) STEM F1; Trinity College
2008 (Malaysia) Kuala Lumpur	(England) Pulse; Devonport High School for Boys	(Australia) Goshawk; Trinity Christian School (ACT)	(Australia) Impulse F1; Barker College	(Australia) Impulse F1; Barker College
2009 (United Kingdom) London	(Republic of Ireland) The Koni Kats; St. David's Secondary School	(Australia) Redline Racing; Trinity Christian School	(Australia) (Canada) AC Racing; Noosa District State High School (QLD) & Miles MacDonell (MB)	(Australia) Redline Racing; Trinity Christian School
2010; Singapore	(United States) Unitus Racing; Southeast High School (FL) & James Madison Middle School (VA)	(Australia) (United Arab Emirates) Zer0.9; Pine Rivers State High School & The Indian High School, Dubai	(Germany) Aixtreme Racing; Einhard-Gymnasium Aachen	(Australia) Basilisk Performance; Sebastopol College
2011 (Malaysia) Kuala Lumpur	(Australia) PentaGliders; Brooks High School	(Germany) BETAGREEN; Gymnasium Grootmoor	(United States) Unitus Racing; Southeast High School (FL) & James Madison Middle School (VA)	(Australia) PentaGliders; Brooks High School
2012 (United Arab Emirates) Abu Dhabi	(Australia) Cold Fusion; Brighton Secondary School	(United Kingdom) Team Ignite	(England) Rush; Robert May's School	(Australia) Cold Fusion; Brighton Secondary School
2013 (United States) Austin	(Australia) A1 Racing; Phoenix P-12 Community College (VIC) & Pine Rivers State High School (QLD)	(United States) Allegiance Racing; Southeast High School (FL)	(Germany) Unlimited Acceleration; Lessing-Gymnasium Winnenden (BW)	(Republic of Ireland) Bardahl Racing; St David's Holy Faith Secondary School
2014 (United Arab Emirates) Abu Dhabi	(England) Colossus F1; 907.7 Points; Robert May's School	(Australia) Gamma Raycing; 844.2 Points; Magdalene Catholic High School (NSW)	(Germany) Boreas Racing; 840.5 Points; Gymnasium An der Stenner Iserlohn (NRW)	(England) Colossus F1; Robert May's School
2015; Singapore	(Germany) (United States) Union Racing International; Alexander-von-Humboldt Gymnasium Greifswald (MV) & Lexington High School (MA)	(Portugal) Mustangs	(Republic of Ireland) Team AIB Racing	(Canada) Laminar Racing
2016 (United States) Austin	(Australia) Infinitude; 837.8 Points; Brighton Secondary School & St Bede's College	(Greece) Infinite Racing; 852.3 Points; Mandoulides School	(Germany) Endeavour; 770.5 Points; Gymnasium Unterrieden Sindelfingen (BW), Karl-Friedrich-Gymnasium (BW) & Kurfürst-Friedrich-Gymnasium (BW)	(United Arab Emirates) Knight Hawks; The Indian High School, Dubai
2017 (Malaysia) Kuala Lumpur	(Australia) Hyperdrive; 906.7 Points; Trinity Grammar School	(Australia) (Germany) Aurora; 887.5 Points; Brighton Secondary School & Fichte-Gymnasium Hagen	(Germany) Pioneers; 873.0 Points; Gymnasium Kronshagen	(Australia) Hyperdrive; Trinity Grammar School
2018; Singapore	(Australia) Horizon; 878.4 Points; Brighton Secondary School	(Republic of Ireland) CJJ AutoVinco; 860.0 Points; St. Brigid's College, Loughrea	(United States) Perspective; 834.7 Points; Palmetto High School	(Australia) Horizon; Brighton Secondary School
2019 (United Arab Emirates) Abu Dhabi	(United Kingdom) Evolve UK; 855.5 Points; Queen Elizabeth's Grammar School	(Germany) Fusion; 826.8 Points; Gymnasium Unterrieden Sindelfingen	(United Kingdom) Aflex Hose Centurion Racing; 820.2 Points; Rishworth School	(Australia) Ascension; Mount View High School & Penrith Christian School
2020(21); United Kingdom	(United Kingdom) Britannia Red; 882.1 Points; Robert May's School	(Republic of Ireland) Quintolux; 834.0 Points; St. Brigid's College, Loughrea	(Australia) Nebula; 792.9 Points; Wesley College	(United Kingdom) Britannia Red; Robert May's School
2021(22) (United Kingdom) Silverstone	(Australia) Hydron; 880.0 Points; Trinity Grammar School, Kew	(Wales) BLACKOUT; 856.0 Points; St John's College, Cardiff	(India) Blaze; 827.1 Points; The British School, New Delhi	(Australia) Hydron; Trinity Grammar School, Kew
2023 Singapore	(Germany) Recoil Racing; 846.5 Points; Marie-Therese-Gymnasium Erlangen	(Australia) Propulsion; 834.9 Points; Charles Campbell College	(England) Nightingale; 776.3 Points; Robert May's School, Hampshire	(Australia) Propulsion; Charles Campbell College
2024 (Saudi Arabia) Jeddah	(Germany) evolut1on 867.3 Points; Karl-Maybach-Gymnasium	(Germany) Array; 811.2 Points; Gymnasium Grootmoor, Hamburg	(Australia) Lunar; 808.3 Points; Brighton Grammar School	(Saudi Arabia) Oryx; King Abdulaziz Center for World Culture (Ithra)
2025 Singapore	(Australia) Lunar; 875.0 Points; Brighton Grammar School	(Germany) Blue Wolves; 853.5 Points; Gymnasium in der Taus Backnang	(United Kingdom) SBA Unity Racing; 834.1 Points; Scarborough University Technical College	(Australia) Lunar; Brighton Grammar School
2026 Singapore	(Saudi Arabia) Lynx Racing 827.5 Points King Abdulaziz Center for World Culture (Ithra)	(Germany) Aixplosion 823.7 Points städtisches Einhard-Gymnasium	(Germany) Spectrum 819.6 Points Gymnasium Unterrieden, Theodor-Mommsen-Schule & Max-Born-Gymnasium	(Germany) Aixplosion städtisches Einhard-Gymnasium
2027 TBC	TBC	TBC	TBC	TBC
