= Trinity Christian School, Canberra =

Coordinates: 35.4082°S 149.0865°E

Trinity Christian School
- Canberra, Australian Capital Territory; Australia

Information
- Type: Independent, day
- Motto: Love, Nurture and Service
- Denomination: Non-denominational Christian
- Established: 1980
- Employees: >100
- Enrolment: ~1150
- Colours: Navy blue, white and bottle green
- Slogan: Love, nurture, service
- Website: http://www.tcs.act.edu.au

Trinity Christian School, founded in 1980, is a private Christian P-12 school located in Wanniassa in the Tuggeranong Valley of Canberra, ACT, Australia.

== History ==
Shortly after its founding in 1980, Trinity was among three schools that were included in a proposal by the then Education minister, Wal Fife. The idea was that schools with falling enrolments should take in students from private schools.

Trinity has a history of staff who wrote musicals, which the students then performed and toured around the country with. An example was To The Snowy, a musical about the Snowy Mountains Scheme, written in 1992 by teachers Peter Hind, Jenny Horsfield and Rob Long. The school toured the Snowy Mountains performing it at towns that were significant in the Snowy Scheme, including Cooma, Tumut, Adaminaby and Jindabyne. The school toured the musical again in the same region in 1999 as part of the 50th anniversary celebrations of the start of the Snowy Scheme.

== Facilities ==
The campus of Trinity Christian School consists of a mixture of brick and corrugated iron facade standalone buildings. In addition to classrooms the school's facilities include science labs, computer rooms, a performing arts center, a metal and woodwork workshop and a kitchen teaching space. Sporting facilities include two ovals, a large gymnasium hall and asphalt basketball/netball courts.

== Principals ==
Name	Term
Peter Corderoy	1980–1989
David Bewley	1990–1992
Winston Newman	1993–1999
Carl Palmer	2000–2011
Andrew Clayton	2012–2016
Jason Ward	2017
Ian Hewitt	2018-2025
Rachel McClure	2025–present

== Enrolment and staff ==
Trinity Christian School has approximately 1150 students and is divided into three sections: Junior (K-5), Middle (6-8) and Senior (9-12). The staff includes 76 full-time teachers, and 32 part-time teachers.

== Extracurricular activities ==
Extracurricular activities include several school bands and vocal ensembles, ISCF, Duke of Edinburgh's Award Scheme, musical production, academic clubs, and yearly grade-wide school camps.

=== Mission trips ===
Each year students from the senior section of the school are given the opportunity to go on a mission trip. Destinations have included Uganda (via South Africa), India, Morapoi Station, WA, Narromine, NSW and Wellington, NSW.

=== F1 in Schools ===
Students from Trinity have competed at several F1 in Schools competitions. Team Goshawk won the amateur championship in Canberra in 2007 and took second place overall at the 2008 World Championship in Kuala Lumpur, Malaysia. They were presented the coveted award for "Best Engineered Design". In 2008 team Redline Racing won the national finals in Canberra. They placed 2nd at the 2009 World Championships in London where they won the award for the fastest car.

=== Contact with the International Space Station ===
In 2010 students from Trinity made contact with the International Space Station as part of the Wireless Institute of Australia's 100th anniversary. Students had the opportunity to ask astronauts about life in space.

== Clubs ==
At Trinity Christian School, students can take part in a diverse range of clubs and extracurricular activities, including Chess Club, Thinking Club (Years 10–12), Book Club/s, Choir, and many more. These activities encourage students to pursue their passions, strengthen their skills, collaborate with others, and actively contribute to the school community.

== Notable alumni ==
- Alistair Coe, former leader of the Canberra Liberals
- Lydia Williams, Indigenous Australian goalkeeper for the Matildas

== See also ==
- List of schools in the Australian Capital Territory
