= Sisters of the Holy Faith =

Roman Catholic religious congregation (Vincentian)

- Holy Faith Sisters
- Formation: 1857; 169 years ago
- Founder: Margaret Aylward
- Type: Catholic religious order
- Headquarters: Glasnevin, Dublin
- Website: holyfaithsisters.org

The Sisters of the Holy Faith is a Catholic religious congregation, originally for the care of Catholic orphans. It now works broadly in the areas of education and faith development. The congregation is part of the Vincentian family.

== History ==
It was founded in Dublin, in 1857, by Margaret Aylward, under the direction of John Gowan from the St. Peter's Vincentian Community in Phibsboro, Dublin.

The founder was called a Confessor of the Faith by Pope Pius IX, because of the imprisonment of six months she endured. She was convicted of contempt of court, but acquitted of a charge of kidnapping, after having refused to produce and return an abandoned child to its mother.

The congregation is especially active in the Archdiocese of Dublin, the residence of the superior general being at Glasnevin, where the sisters conducted a boarding-school for young women. The Glasnevin establishment no longer has a boarding school; the order's archives are stored and maintained here, and the order now has a nursing home, Marian House, on the Glasnevin campus.

The original foundation was St. Brigid's Orphanage, Dublin, where over 3000 orphans were accommodated and trained.

== Activities ==
The order's ministry is in education, faith development and the promotion of justice. They set up and run a number of primary and secondary schools primarily in Dublin. Today the order works in Ireland, United States of America, Australia, New Zealand, Trinidad and South Sudan.

The Holy Faith sisters in collaboration with the Saint Patrick's Society for the Foreign Missions (Kiltegan Fathers), in 2013, worked to set up a primary school in Riwoto, South Sudan.

The St. Johns Education Centre is an initiative established in 1999 by the Holy Faith Sisters and De La Salle Brothers, to help students at risk of dropping out of the education system.

The Margaret Aylward Centre for Faith and Dialogue was built on the grounds of the Holy Faith Convent, in Glasnevin, in 2014 it held its inaugural lecture. The centre is used for conferences, meetings, retreats, lectures and courses.

== Schools ==
The order's schools in Ireland are part of the Le Chéile Schools Trust:

- St. Michael's Holy Faith Finglas
- St David's Holy Faith, Greystones
- St. Brigids National School, Killester
- Holy Faith Secondary School, Clontarf
- St. Mary's Holy Faith Glasnevin (Secondary School)
- St. Mary's Holy Faith Killester (Secondary School)
- Margaret Aylward School (founded by order in 1969 transferred to Dublin VEC in 1983)
- Mother of Divine Grace, Primary School, Ballygall, Glasnevin, Dublin 11.
- St Wolstan’s Community School, Ballymakealy, Clane Road, Celbridge, County Kildare (with Archdiocese of Dublin and Kildare Kildare Wicklow ETB)
- Tallaght Community School, Balrothery, Tallaght, Dublin 24 (with Marist Brothers and County Dublin DDLETB)
- Holy Faith Convent of Trinidad and Tobago
