= St David's Holy Faith Secondary School, Greystones =

Saint David's Holy Faith Secondary School

Location
- Kimberley Road; Greystones, County Wicklow; Ireland; 53.1467°N 6.0611°W

Information
- School type: Voluntary secondary (Roman Catholic)
- Patron saint: Le Chéile Schools Trust
- Founded: 1906
- Principal: Simon Carey (as of 2024)
- Years: First through sixth
- Gender: Co-educational
- Enrollment: 753 (2024)
- Website: www.stdavids.ie

Saint David's Holy Faith Secondary School is a co-educational secondary school in Greystones, County Wicklow, Ireland. Originally established in 1906 as an all-girls boarding school by the Holy Faith Sisters, it was the only secondary school in Greystones until 2014. By 2015, Saint David's school was operating under the patronage of the Le Chéile Schools Trust. As of December 2024, the school had an enrollment of approximately 750 pupils.

In 2024, a new school building was opened. This development project, which included a new sports hall and library, involved a "retrofit of the [original] 1950s and 1970s school building". The new building received a "Public Buildings and Infrastructure Award" from the Royal Institute of the Architects of Ireland (RIAI).

== Extra-curricular activities ==
In 2009, a team representing the school became the first Irish team to win the F1 in Schools world championship competition. A team from the school also won a "best engineered car" award at the 2013 world championship event.

== Notable past pupils ==
- Paul McShane, footballer
- Maria Doyle Kennedy, singer, songwriter, and television/film actress
- Simon Harris, 16th Taoiseach
- Stephen Donnelly, Minister for Health 2020–2025
