= Margaret Aylward =

Irish Roman Catholic nun

- Born: 23 November 1810
- Died: 11 October 1889 (aged 78)
- Known for: Philanthropist and founder of Sisters of the Holy Faith

Margaret Louisa Aylward (1810-1889) was an Irish Catholic nun, philanthropist, and founder of the Sisters of the Holy Faith.

== Early life ==
Margaret Aylward was born on 23 November 1810 in Thomas Street in Waterford to a wealthy merchant family. She was educated by the Ursuline nuns in Thurles, County Tipperary. After doing some charitable work in Waterford in her early years, Aylward joined her sister in the Sisters of Charity in 1834 as a novice. She left the noviciate in 1836 and returned to Waterford to continue her charity work in a secular role. Aylward again attempted to join a religious order in 1846 when she entered the Ursuline noviciate in Waterford, however she left after two months.

== Charity work in Dublin ==
By 1851, Aylward had moved to Dublin where she was active in re-energising the Ladies' Association of St Vincent de Paul. The Irish Famine led to a large-scale movement of people from rural areas into cities, including Dublin, which led to increased pressure on the charitable institutions of these areas. Aylward's efforts were part of this wider charitable effort to help the poor, particularly Catholics who were seen to be at risk of coercive religious conversion (known as Souperism). This association was concerned with the 'temporal as well as the spiritual relief of the sick poor in Dublin.'

The Ladies' Association of St Vincent de Paul opened St Brigid's in 1856, an orphanage which had an anti-proselytising mission and claimed to 'rescue' Catholic children from Protestant agencies. The Ladies' Association often came into dispute with those involved in the Irish Church Missions and the ragged schools in Dublin, with members of the Ladies' Association distributing crucifixes to children attending the Protestant-run ragged schools and visiting the homes of parents who sent their children to them. The women involved in St Brigid's Orphanage organised themselves into a society called the Daughters of St. Brigid. However, while the establishment of St Brigid's brought Aylward closer to religious orders, historian Maria Luddy notes that in the 1850s, Aylward was not concerned with the establishment of a religious community, rather she wanted to 'live in a community of women who were united by their religious convictions but did not necessarily desire to take formal religious vows.'

== Sisters of the Holy Faith ==
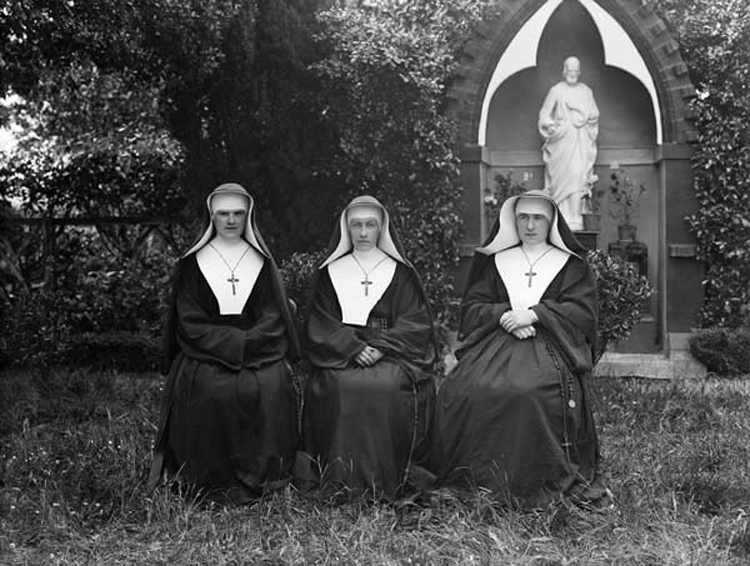
Group picture of nuns from Convent of the Holy Faith Ireland 1915.

There was a growth in religious orders for women in Ireland from the early nineteenth century due to a relaxing of anti-Catholic Penal Laws. These included the Irish Sisters of Charity who were established in 1815 under Mary Aikenhead, the Irish Loreto Order (1822) under Frances Ball, and Catherine McAuley's Sisters of Mercy (1831). Archbishop Cullen of Dublin was an important figure in persuading leaders of religious communities of women, like Catherine McAuley, to formally organise as religious congregations in order to continue their charitable work and be respectable. While Aylward was resistant to this idea for a while, she eventually agreed. In 1857 the Sisters of the Holy Faith were established, and in 1869 the order were approved by Pope Pius IX.

Aylward was arrested in 1860 for 'failing to produce a child named Mary Matthews, who had been taken away and concealed from her parents for the purpose of being brought up in the Roman Catholic faith'. Matthews had been placed with a nurse in Saggart, County Dublin when her father had died and her mother had emigrated to the Bahamas. When her mother returned, Aylward was notified by Matthews' foster mother that she was missing. While, during the trial, Aylward reputedly "indicated that she desired to separate the child from her mother", she was not found guilty of kidnapping. She was, however, found to be in contempt of court and sentenced to six months in jail. Aylward continued her work after her release.

== Death and legacy ==
Margaret Aylward (now Sister Mary Agatha) died on 11 October 1889. Aylward had continued wearing her own clothes and travelling after taking her religious vows.

Historian Margaret Helen Preston argues that Aylward was unusual for the time that she lived in because she did not believe that poverty resulted from sin. Aylward referred to the poor as the 'Elect of God' and argued that God saw the poor as special because of their difficult circumstances.

The Sisters of the Holy Faith still work around the world.
