= Mount View High School (Cessnock) =

Location
- 106 Mount View Road, Cessnock, Hunter Region, New South Wales; Australia; 32°49′41″S 151°19′56.6″E

Information
- Type: Government-funded co-educational comprehensive secondary day school
- Established: 1985; 41 years ago
- School district: Cessnock; Regional North
- Educational authority: New South Wales Department of Education
- Principal: Shane Hookway
- Teaching staff: 76.0 FTE (2025)
- Years: 7–12
- Enrolment: 930 (2025)
- Campus type: Regional
- Colours: Red, grey, and white
- Website: mountview-h.schools.nsw.gov.au

Mount View High School is a government-funded co-educational comprehensive secondary day school, located in Western Cessnock, in the Hunter Region of New South Wales, Australia.

Established in 1985, the school enrolled approximately 930 students in 2025, from Year 7 to Year 12, of whom 24 percent identified as Indigenous Australians and five percent were from a language background other than English. The school is fully operated by the NSW Department of Education; the principal is Shane Hookway as of 2026.

== Overview ==
The school conducts a working vineyard and the P&C sells the wine to the public to raise funds for courses like their metal, wood, food and textile classes that they have to offer to students and other necessities. The school also offers an extensive agricultural studies course.

=== F1 in Schools program ===
Mount View High School has had major successes in the F1 in Schools program, winning the NSW state finals in 2016 with 'Revolution Racing' and in 2017 with 'Pentessellate', with each team going on to place fourth at the national finals in their respective winning seasons. In 2017 'Revolution Racing' collaborated with 'Instant Transmission' a team from Queechy High School to form 'Envisity' and compete at the world finals where they placed 14th.

== Incidents ==
=== 2024 Storm ===
On November 7, 2024, a large storm hit the area just before the school finished for the day, sending debris flying with winds up to 70 km/h (44 mph) and creating large hailstones. Large trees were broken and crushed cars, with the school commenting that it "significantly" impacted the safe exit of students and staff. The school was declared "safe" the following morning on the Friday with most of the work being completed on Thursday night. A tree had crushed a section of the industry class rooms and is still under repair as of December 2025.

== See also ==
- List of government schools in New South Wales
- Education in Australia
