= Le Chéile Schools Trust =

Charity managing schools in Ireland for religious orders

- Founded: 2004; 22 years ago
- Type: Educational
- Registration no.: CHY 18017
- Location: Ireland
- Services: Primary education; Secondary education; Teacher education; Advocacy
- Website: https://lecheiletrust.ie/

The Le Chéile Schools Trust is a charitable trust which manages around 60 schools in Ireland on behalf of fifteen Roman Catholic religious congregations.

== History ==
The majority of secondary schools and some junior schools in Ireland were established and managed by various Roman Catholic religious congregations. In the late 1900s, these religious orders had declined in number and it was decided to pool their resources in a number of collaborative arrangements known as trusts. The Le Chéile Schools Trust was established in 2004 and fully enacted over the following years. The trust was formally established as a company limited by guarantee in 2008.

The trust was originally set up by twelve Roman Catholic religious congregations. In 2009, the Sisters of St. Joseph of Cluny joined the trust. followed by the Ursuline College in 2013 and the Marianists (St Laurence College) in 2019.

In September 2014, in Tyrellstown near Blanchardstown, the trust opened the first new Catholic secondary school in Ireland in thirty years.

== Mission and establishment ==
Its mission is to maintain and promote the Catholic ethos of these schools, and develop new schools where the need arises. There are a total of 59 voluntary and 7 community schools managed by the trust.

== Participating congregations ==
As of 2024, congregations participating in the trust included:

- De La Salle Brothers
- Dominican Sisters
- Faithful Companions of Jesus
- Patrician Brothers
- Poor Servants of the Mother of God
- Sisters of Christian Education
- Sisters of Jesus and Mary
- Sisters of St. Paul
- Sisters of St. Louis
- Sisters of the Cross and Passion
- Sisters of St. Joseph of Cluny
- Society of the Holy Child Jesus
- Sisters of the Holy Faith
- Ursuline Sisters
- Marianists of Ireland

== Schools ==
Schools within the trust include:

=== Cork ===
- St Aloysius College, Carrigtwohill
- St. Angela's College, Cork
- Ursuline College, Blackrock, Cork
- Le Chéile Secondary School, Ballincollig

=== Dublin ===
- Árdscoil La Salle, Raheny, Dublin 5
- Beneavin De La Salle College, Beneavin Rd, Dublin 11
- Da La Salle College, Churchtown, Dublin
- Holy Faith Secondary School, Clontarf, Dublin 3
- Le Cheile Secondary School, Tyrrelstown, Dublin
- Maryfield College, Dublin
- Mother of Divine Grace, Primary School, Ballygall, Glasnevin, Dublin 11 (Holy Faith Sisters)
- Mount Sackville Secondary School, Chapelizod, Dublin (Sisters of St Joseph of Cluny)
- Muckross Park College, Dublin
- Our Lady's School, Templeogue, Dublin
- Our Lady’s Grove, Goatstown, Dublin 14
- St. Benildus College, Kilmacud, Dublin
- St. Dominic's College, Cabra
- St. John's College, Ballyfermot, Dublin
- St. Louis Infant School, Rathmines, Dublin 6
- St Laurence College, Loughlinstown, Co. Dublin
- St. Louis Primary School, Rathmines, Dublin 6
- St. Paul’s Senior Primary School, Dublin 12

=== Galway ===
- Dominican College, Galway
- Scoil Íde, Salthill, Galway

=== Kildare ===
- St. Wolstan's Community School, Celbridge

=== Limerick ===
- Laurel Hill Coláiste FCJ, Limerick
- Scoil Pól, Kilfinane

=== Sligo ===
- Ursuline College Sligo (Ursuline Sisters)

=== Tipperary ===
- Scoil Angela, Thurles

=== Waterford ===
- De La Salle College Waterford

=== Wicklow ===
- St David's Holy Faith Secondary School, Greystones

=== Monaghan ===
- St Louis Secondary School, Monaghan
- St Louis Secondary School, Carrickmacross

== Operations ==
The trust's administration office is based in the Jesuit complex at Milltown Park, Dublin, and the trust produces a newsletter called Le Cheile Update.
