= Odiham =

Village and parish in Hampshire, England

Coordinates: 51.254°N 0.939°W

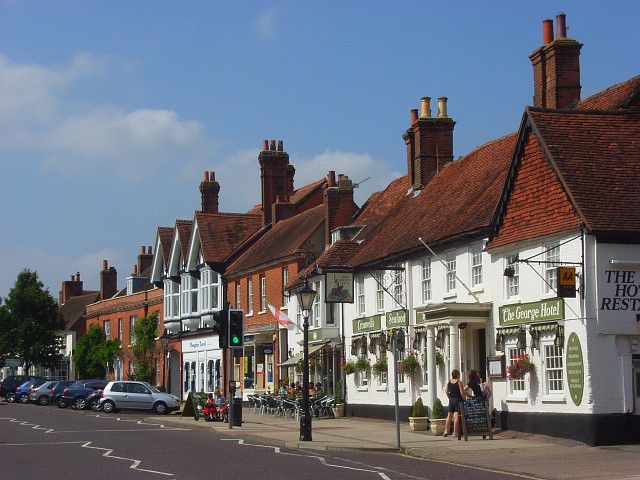
- Odiham High Street

- Location within Hampshire
- Population: 4,406; 5,616 (civil parish 2011 including North Warnborough)
- OS grid reference: SU7354250136
  - London: 41 miles
- Civil parish: Odiham
- District: Hart
- Shire county: Hampshire
- Region: South East
- Country: England
- Sovereign state: United Kingdom
- Post town: Hook
- Postcode district: RG29
- Dialling code: 01256
- Police: Hampshire and Isle of Wight
- Fire: Hampshire and Isle of Wight
- Ambulance: South Central
- UK Parliament: North East Hampshire

Odiham (/ˈoʊdiəm/) is a large historic village and civil parish in the Hart district of Hampshire, England. It has been twinned with Sourdeval in the Manche Department of France since 1993. The 2011 population was 4,406. The parish in 1851 had an area of 7,354 acres with 50 acres covered by water. The nearest railway station is at Hook, on the South West main line. The village had its own hundred, named The Hundred of Odiham. The village is situated slightly south of the M3 motorway and approximately midway between the north Hampshire towns Fleet and Basingstoke, 37 miles (59.5 km) north-northeast of Southampton and 43 miles (69 km) southwest of London.

RAF Odiham, home of the Royal Air Force's Chinook heavy lift helicopter fleet, lies to the south of the village.

== History ==
The first written record of Odiham's existence is in the Domesday Book (1086), where it appears with its current spelling, although the spellings Odiam and Wudiham have sometimes been used since.

=== Odiham Castle ===
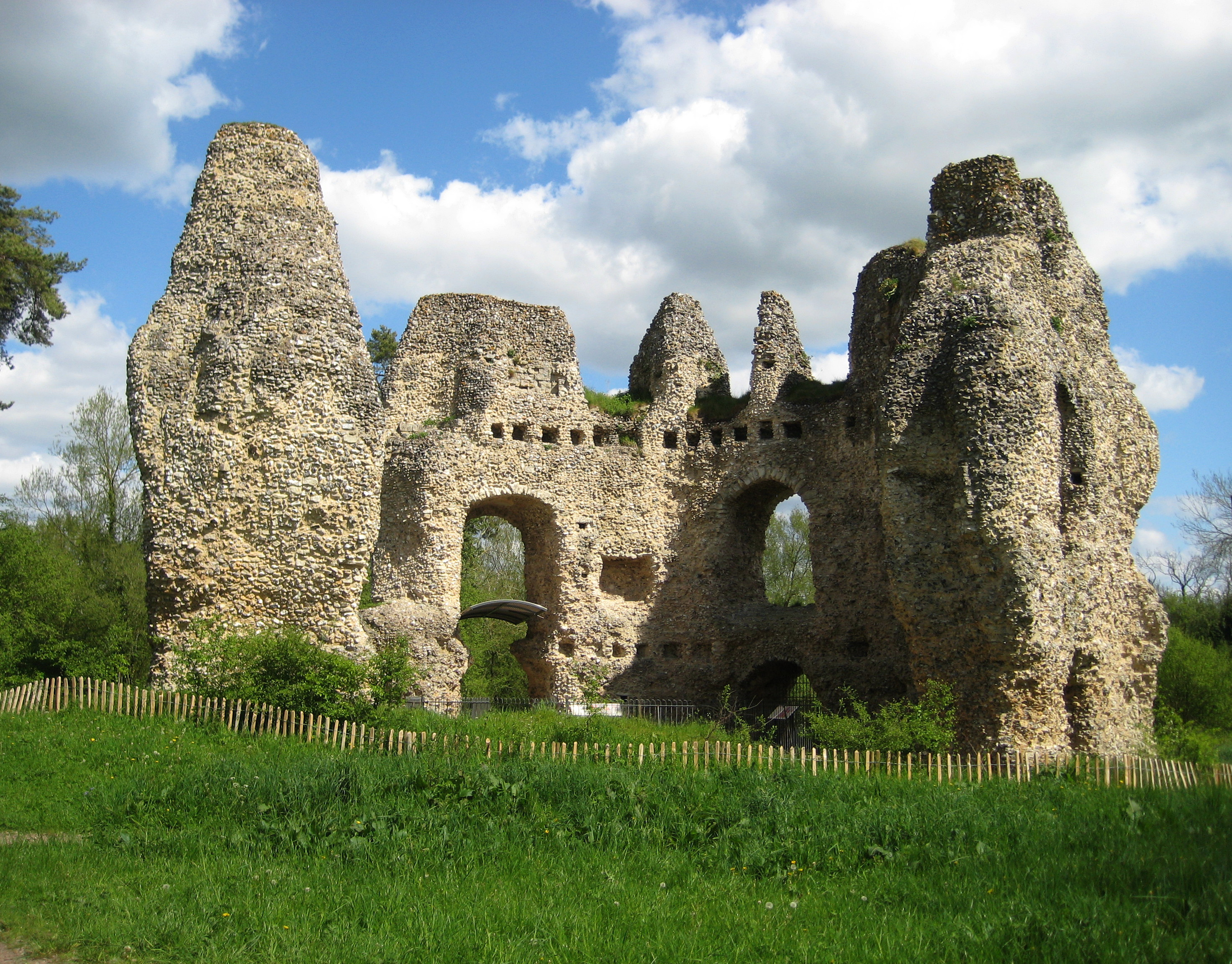
Odiham Castle ruins

King John decided in 1204 to build Odiham Castle and it was built during the years 1207 to 1214 at a cost of over £1000. He already had some ninety strongholds all over the country, and he may have chosen Odiham because it is halfway between Windsor and Winchester. In 1216 the French Dauphin Louis VIII besieged King John in the castle for two weeks.

King Henry III, son of King John, gave the castle to his sister Eleanor in 1236, so when she married Simon de Montfort in 1238 the castle became the de Montfort family home. However, Simon was killed in the Battle of Evesham in 1265 when he led the rebellious barons to fight against the king; Eleanor was sent into exile.

During the fourteenth century the castle played a role in several significant events, including a sitting of Parliament, and the imprisonment of King David II of Scotland in the castle for eleven years. during the reign of Edward III of England. However, by the fifteenth century its only use was as a hunting lodge. Odiham Park was a park which contained a hunting lodge owned by Henry VIII of England. On 4 August 1531, he stayed there with Anne Boleyn, who would later become his second wife.

The castle was described in 1605 as a ruin, which it remains to this day.

=== Odiham Pest House ===
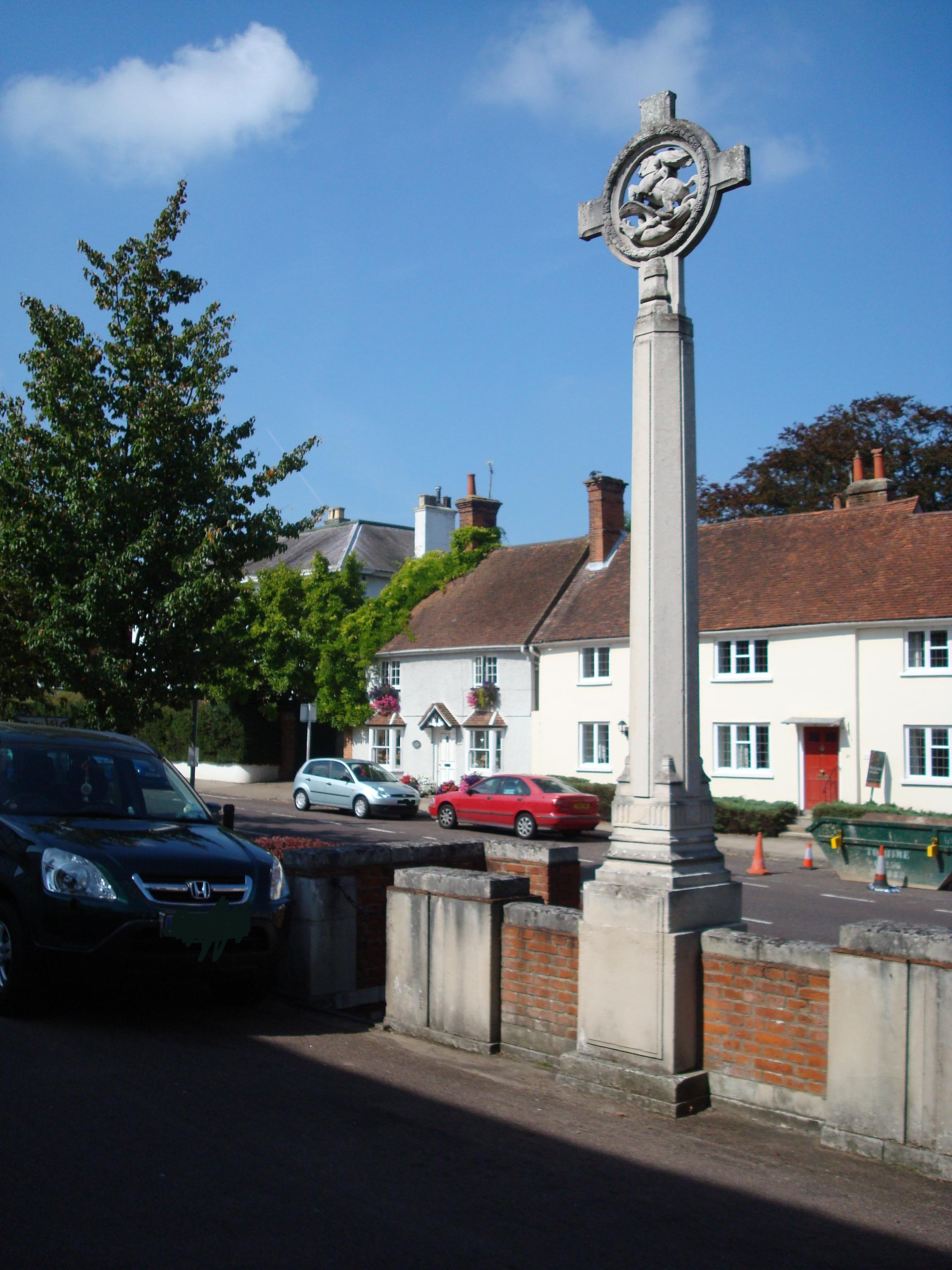
The war memorial

The Pest house was built c. 1622 and subsequently housed local people and travellers suffering from the plague, smallpox and other infectious diseases. Many such "isolation hospitals" were built in that period but the Odiham Pest House is one of only five examples surviving. It was restored by the Odiham Society in 1981 to form a mini Heritage Centre.

=== William Lily ===
Thomas Cox wrote in 1738:

This Place is famous for giving Birth to Mr. William Lily, who wrote the Grammar; which, with some Alterations, is commanded by Act of Parliament in King Henry VIII's Reign, to be taught in all Schools. He died master of St. Paul's School, London, Anno 1522.

=== Odiham Agricultural Society ===
On 16 May 1783, a group drawn from 'Gentlemen of Rank, fortune and Ingenuity' plus some 'intelligent farmers' met in The George Inn, Odiham to inaugurate the Odiham Agricultural Society as a 'society for the encouraging of Agricultural and Industry in their village and neighbourhood'. Influenced by key members like Thomas Burgess and Granville Penn, the Society also resolved to reform farriery and animal care by establishing a school to teach veterinary science in England. This was to result in a far-reaching outcome: the foundation of the Royal Veterinary Society and the birth of the veterinary profession in Britain.

== Education ==
- Robert May's School was founded in 1694.

In 2020, Hampshire County Council announced plans to close Odiham library.

== Climate ==
Climate data for Odiham (1991–2020 normals, extremes 1984-)
Month	Jan	Feb	Mar	Apr	May	Jun	Jul	Aug	Sep	Oct	Nov	Dec	Year
Record high °C (°F)	14.4 (57.9)	18.7 (65.7)	22.1 (71.8)	26.6 (79.9)	32.0 (89.6)	32.1 (89.8)	35.7 (96.3)	35.1 (95.2)	31.2 (88.2)	27.1 (80.8)	17.7 (63.9)	15.8 (60.4)	35.7 (96.3)
Mean daily maximum °C (°F)	7.5 (45.5)	8.0 (46.4)	10.7 (51.3)	13.8 (56.8)	17.1 (62.8)	19.9 (67.8)	22.1 (71.8)	21.8 (71.2)	18.9 (66.0)	14.7 (58.5)	10.6 (51.1)	7.9 (46.2)	14.5 (58.1)
Daily mean °C (°F)	4.7 (40.5)	4.8 (40.6)	6.8 (44.2)	9.2 (48.6)	12.4 (54.3)	15.3 (59.5)	17.4 (63.3)	17.2 (63.0)	14.6 (58.3)	11.2 (52.2)	7.5 (45.5)	5.0 (41.0)	10.5 (50.9)
Mean daily minimum °C (°F)	1.8 (35.2)	1.7 (35.1)	3.0 (37.4)	4.7 (40.5)	7.7 (45.9)	10.6 (51.1)	12.6 (54.7)	12.5 (54.5)	10.2 (50.4)	7.7 (45.9)	4.4 (39.9)	2.1 (35.8)	6.6 (43.9)
Record low °C (°F)	−11.1 (12.0)	−12.6 (9.3)	−6.9 (19.6)	−4.7 (23.5)	−1.7 (28.9)	2.2 (36.0)	4.8 (40.6)	4.4 (39.9)	1.4 (34.5)	−4.4 (24.1)	−8.0 (17.6)	−13.0 (8.6)	−13.0 (8.6)
Average precipitation mm (inches)	83.7 (3.30)	61.1 (2.41)	50.8 (2.00)	54.5 (2.15)	48.9 (1.93)	53.3 (2.10)	50.8 (2.00)	58.4 (2.30)	61.0 (2.40)	87.5 (3.44)	90.8 (3.57)	82.4 (3.24)	783.3 (30.84)
Average precipitation days (≥ 1.0 mm)	13.0	10.7	9.5	9.8	8.7	8.5	8.4	9.1	8.9	12.0	13.1	12.4	124.2
Mean monthly sunshine hours	63.7	82.3	126.6	178.8	214.2	213.3	220.0	201.5	157.0	116.7	72.0	59.3	1,705.3
Source 1: Met Office
Source 2: Starlings Roost Weather

== Notable people ==
- Reverend William Addison (VC) (1883–1962) was educated at Robert May's School. Awarded Victoria Cross in World War I, and street in the village named after him.
- Louis Foster (born 2003), racing driver.
- Brigadier Manley James (VC) (1896–1975) was born and spent his childhood in the village. Awarded Victoria Cross in World War I, and street in the village named after him.
- Philip Lutley Sclater FRS FRGS FZS FLS (1829–1913), lawyer and zoologist

== See also ==
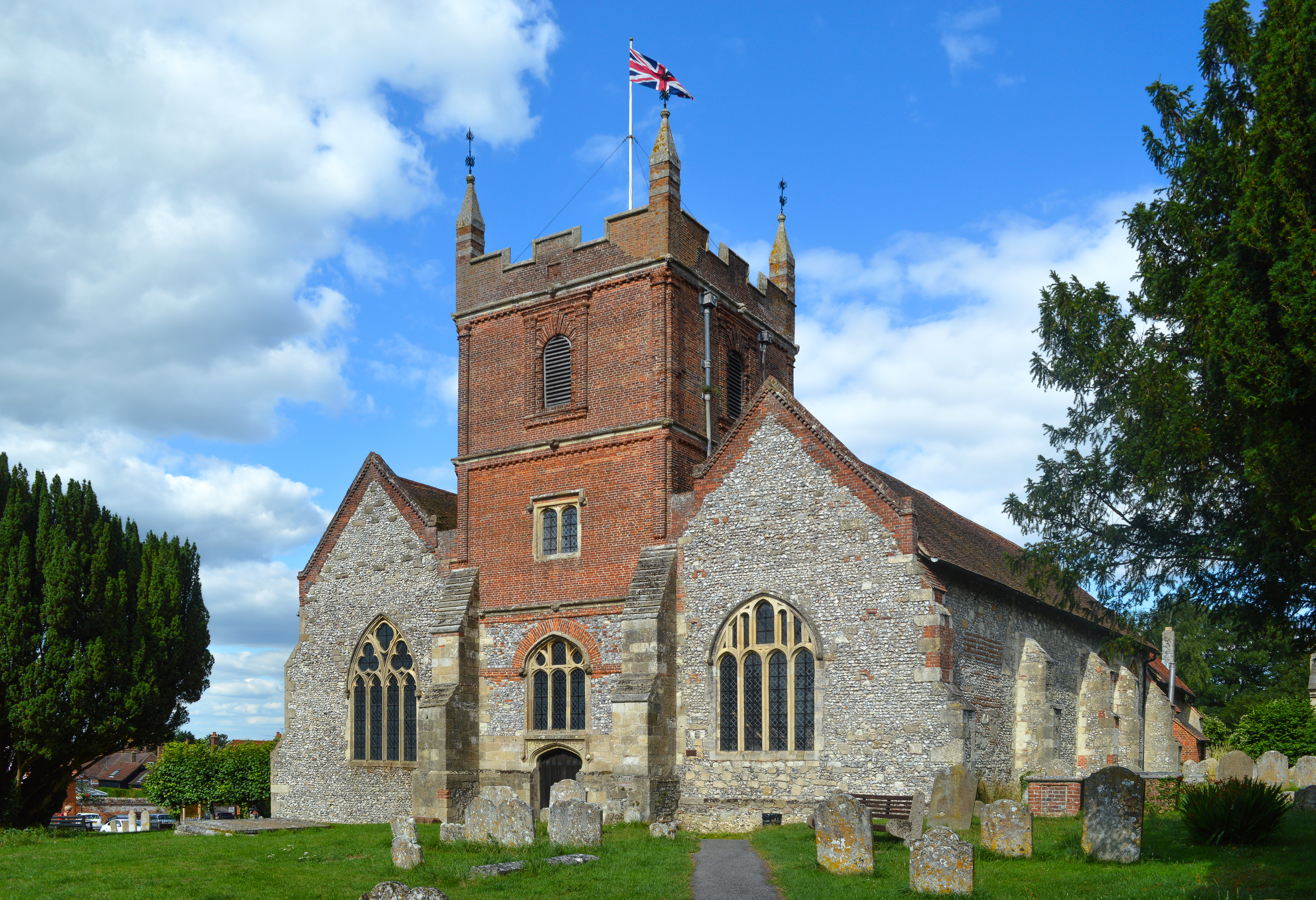
All Saints Church, Odiham

- All Saints Church, Odiham, a Grade I listed building in the village
- HMS Odiham, a Ham class minesweeper
- The Basingstoke Canal, which passes Odiham.
