= Pat Barker (academic) =

Irish academic, accountant and public leader

- Born: June 1949 (age 77); Dublin, Ireland
- Spouse: Robert Barker
- Children: 2

Academic background
- Education: Belgrove NS and Holy Faith School, Clontarf
- Alma mater: Trinity College Dublin

Academic work
- Discipline: Accounting, Business Ethics
- Institutions: Dublin City University

Patricia Barker (born Dublin, June 1949) is an Irish academic, accountant and public body leader. One of the earliest staff at NIHE Dublin, she was later Professor of Accounting there, and then Registrar and Vice-President for Teaching and Learning, after it had become Dublin City University. She served nine years as a delegate to the International Accounting Standards Board. She has also worked as an international election monitor for the OSCE, a human rights observer in Israel and Palestine, and as chairperson of the Irish Blood Transfusion Service and a director of other public bodies. A holder of an MPhil in gender studies and a PhD on financial disclosure, she has written and co-written books and articles on accounting, ethics and gender equality.

== Early life ==
Born in Dublin in June 1949, Barker grew up, with a brother, in the northern suburb of Clontarf, in a Church of Ireland family. She attended local Catholic schools, Belgrove National School and the Holy Faith convent school, and took a degree in English at Trinity College Dublin. A keen sailor during her school years, she began a career in sailing instruction in Morocco, but then returned to Dublin and with family help joined a firm of accountants there.

== Career ==
Barker started with Stokes Brothers and Pym (which later merged into what became KPMG) and despite being told that "ladies don't do accounting" took her accountant's articles there in 1973, the 20th woman to qualify in Ireland since chartered accounting began in 1888. She then moved to the UK, working for Harrods. She met her future husband, from Salford in Greater Manchester, on an accounting course in Wales. Engaged by 1972, they settled in Manchester in the mid-1970s, and she both worked in her own practice and with Peat Marwick Mitchell, one of the main firms which merged into KPMG as well as beginning her academic career lecturing there.

She returned to Dublin in 1980, and that September became the third of four initial staff of the business school of NIHE Dublin, which was then working out of a few prefabricated buildings; she helped write many of the initial Business Studies course materials, for subjects from Accounting to Management, HR and Law. Over time she rose to be a senior lecturer and then Professor of Accounting, and then Associate Dean of the Business School. She became registrar and Vice-President for Teaching and Learning (Academic Affairs) of DCU in 2000, the first woman to hold such a senior role at the university. Barker has also worked as a visiting professor in universities in Europe (Angers), Africa (Dar es Salaam, Cape Town, Malawi), North America (New York, Boston) and Australia (Sydney), and extensively as an external examiner.

Barker completed an MPhil in Gender Studies at her alma mater, Trinity College Dublin, and later took her PhD with a thesis on the sharing of financial data with employees, the first doctorate in accounting in Ireland. She is also a Fellow of Chartered Accountants Ireland, the professional governing body, won the Accountancy Ireland Award in 2007 for an article named "Ethics Fatigue – Regulation versus Integrity," and earned a qualification in counselling from Maynooth University.

== Accounting governance roles ==
Barker was a member of the governing council of Chartered Accountants Ireland for nine years, and chaired its accounting committee for twenty, as well as leading its education board for a period, and serving on its ethics and governance committee. She was a delegate to the International Accounting Standards Board, which sets and oversees the International Financial Reporting Standards, for nine years. She also chaired an expert group which studied and reported to the EU on the workings of the European Court of Auditors.

== Publication ==
She has written and co-written both books and articles, on subjects including group accounting, ethics and gender and professional progression, including these books:

- Barker, Patricia and Ó hÓgartaigh, Ciarán; Oak Tree Press, Dublin, 1998: Accounting for Groups: Theory and Practice, ISBN 1860761054
- Barker, Patricia; Institute of Chartered Accountants in Ireland, 2009: The Minority Interest: Women Who Succeed in the Accountancy Profession, ISBN 9780903854108
- Barker, Patricia and Lucey, Cormac; Chartered Accountants Ireland, 2012: The Business Compass: Perspectives on Business Ethics, ISBN 9781912350735

and these papers:

- Barker, Patricia and Monks, Kathy; DCU Business School (1996): The glass ceiling: cracked but not broken? evidence from a study of chartered accountants, ISSN 1393-290X
- Barker, Patricia, Ní Mhanacháin, Aoife and Monks, Kathy (2001): Drama as an opportunity for learning and development, Journal of Management Development (DOI: 10.1108/02621710110395435).

== Public body roles ==
She was appointed a member of the Higher Education Authority, which oversees and partly funds universities and other third-level institutions in Ireland, in 1997; she also chaired its Audit Committee.

Barker accepted an appointment as chairperson of the Blood Transfusion Service Board with effect from April 1999, during a period when the organisation was going through many changes; it was renamed as the Irish Blood Transfusion Service during her time in office. She made proposals to the Minister of Health at the time, Micheál Martin, regarding improvement of corporate governance, highlighting that the board lacked certain competences, including transfusion medicine and medical production, blood end users, HR, the law, and strategy, while instead including such profiles as a hotelier and a marketing executive. She also expressed concern at the treatment of her inputs and role by the Minister and others. She resigned in August 2001 over the fallout from the ways the centralisation of testing, the future of the Cork branch of the service, and governance were being discussed.

In 2014 she was appointed to the Board of Tallaght University Hospital, reappointed in 2016 for 2017–2020, and again appointed, on the nomination of the president of the hospital, for a 2020–2023 term. She has also been a member of the Audit Committee of Ireland's national health authority, the Health Service Executive, and the Irish Courts Service. She served as a director of Dublin Bus for two terms, from 2013–2019, including chairing the Audit Committee. She was also appointed a director of the Marine Institute from 2013–2018, chairing the Audit and Risk Committee, and was reappointed for the 2018–2023 term.

== International body and NGO roles ==
Barker volunteered with the Organization for Security and Co-operation in Europe in oversight of elections, including in South Africa, Bosnia-Herzegovina, Kazakhstan, Montenegro, Malawi and Belarus. She also performed human rights monitoring in Israel and the Palestinian Territories.

Barker has worked with the Dublin Rape Crisis Centre since its foundation in 1979, including as a volunteer counsellor, and served on the board of Women's Aid. She has also been a director of a housing association and Ireland's National Chamber Choir, and a trustee of the Malawi Girls Education Fund.

== Personal life ==
Barker is married to Robert Barker, a tax accountant, and they have two children and two grandchildren. She has been a long-term resident of the Malahide area of northern Dublin and she and her husband are active in the Malahide Church of Ireland community, where she served many years as a parochial Mothers' Union committee member. She has served multiple terms as a member of the governing assembly of the Diocese of Dublin and Glendalough, the Diocesan Synod, delegated by her parish, and has been a supplementalist for the Diocesan Council. She was one of two keynote speakers at a special Dublin and Glendalough Diocesan Forum hosted by the Archbishop at All Hallows College in 2001, and was elected a delegate member of the General Synod of the Church of Ireland for 2020 to 2023.

Barker is a yachtswoman and has crewed and captained to Antarctica.
