= Holy Faith Secondary School, Clontarf =

Girls' second level school, Clontarf, Dublin, Ireland

Coordinates: 53.3602°N 6.19761°W

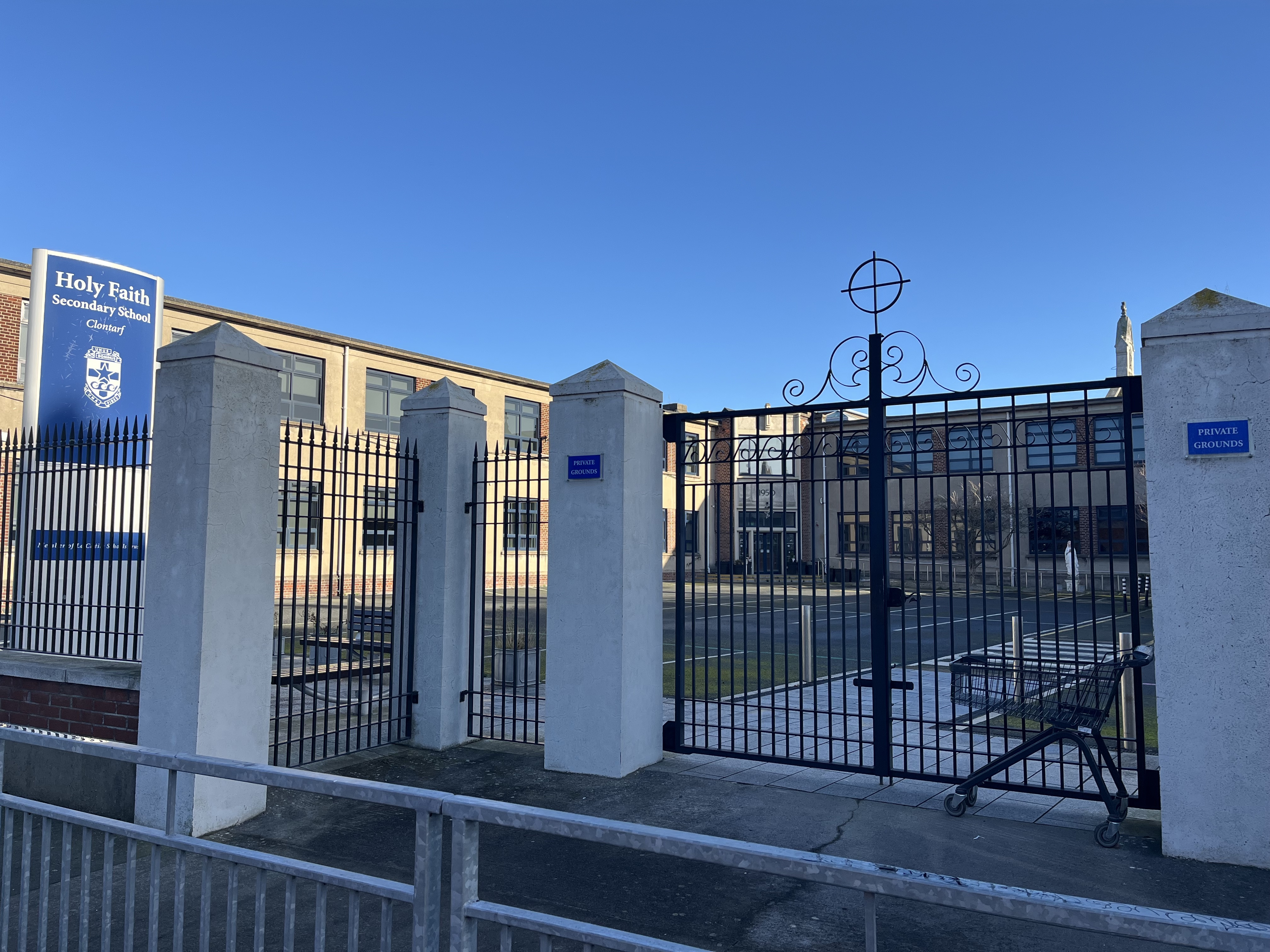

Location
- 1 Belgrove Road, Clontarf, Dublin 3 Dublin, County Dublin; Ireland

Information
- School type: Catholic
- Motto: Unus Dominus, Una Fides (One God, One Faith)
- Founded: 1890
- Oversight: The Le Cheile Schools Trust
- Principal: Deirdre Gogarty
- Years: First through sixth
- Gender: Girls
- Enrolment: 645
- Website: Holy Faith Secondary School, Clontarf

Holy Faith Secondary School, Clontarf is a girls' voluntary second level school in Clontarf on the Northside of Dublin, Ireland. Founded by the Holy Faith Sisters in 1890, and originally providing both primary (mixed sex) and secondary education, it is since 2009 in the care of The Le Cheile Schools Trust. It is notable as one of the 25 schools (of around 800 in Ireland) with the highest progression to third level education. In 2020 it was ranked 1st in North Dublin, and 7th in Ireland, by the Sunday Times.

== History ==
Four Holy Faith nuns were sent to establish a convent and private Catholic school for girls and boys in Clontarf in 1890, in response to an invitation from the parish priest. The convent was named for Our Lady Star of the Sea, and the attached school opened for teaching on 22 September that year, with three girls and one boy. The plan was to have full schooling for girls, with boys taken up to the end of primary school (this was described as a "boys' juniorate"). The original building was on the seafront where Belgrove Road meets the coast road (Clontarf Road), and later became the convent when the school moved further up Belgrove Road. The school was from the beginning a day school, and had, and has, no boarding element.

Already by 1902 the school was expanded with seven new classrooms, and expansion continued, until, in 1942, the remainder of the current site was purchased. The modern school building was commenced on October 3 (the Feast of the Little Flower) 1950, considered to be the founding date for the current school setup, and teaching in the new facilities commenced in September 1953. The new building was formally blessed and launched by John Charles McQuaid, Archbishop of Dublin, on October 2, 1953. The architect was Edward Smith.

The school had its first Leaving Certificate graduates in 1950. Until the 1960s, a typical first year intake was around 100, with around 15 completing secondary school.

Holy Faith Clontarf was initially part-funded by fees, which apparently never came to a significant total. This income was supplemented by funding from the Holy Faith order, and sale of work by the nuns (Communion bread and sewing) as well as donations, including from the nuns' families. It later joined the national "free school scheme", under which the school it has since received its main operational funding from the Department of Education, and does not charge fees, though voluntary contributions are proposed.

Pupil population rose from around 410 in 1962 to a peak of around 820 in 1993, and has been stable in the low to mid-600s since around 2009. Further construction in the 1970s added new laboratory facilities and a geography room, and in the 1980s prefabricated buildings were added to the rear.

The secondary school had its first board of management appointed in 1985, and its first lay principal, Bertha McCullagh in 1987, when 14 nuns remained in the convent. Discussions with parents about future management models began in 2004 and in 2009, it was moved from direct order trusteeship to the Le Cheile Schools Trust, a joint venture of 13 religious orders working in education (which has since risen to 15 orders).

The school purchased the city's one-third interest in a detached one-acre sports field for 75,000 in 2005. Having previously determined the facility to be unsuitable for its use long-term, and over the objections of some parents, it sold the land, valued at over 3 million euro, to developers, using the funds for a planned 2.9 million euro programme of capital improvements.

== Education and extra-curricular activities ==
=== Curriculum and facilities ===
Students at Holy Faith follow the Irish Junior Certificate syllabus in first to third years, with English, Irish for most students, and Mathematics, and generally choosing 4 from 8 additional examination subjects, and the Leaving Certificate syllabus in fifth and sixth year, with a selection of 4 from 17 additional examination subjects, in addition to various supplementary subjects. Fourth year is a mandatory Transition Year, with both basic subjects and a wide range of extra courses and workshops, as well as work experience, social initiatives and time to pursue the national Gaisce youth achievement awards. The school has a strong track record of progression to third level, having ranked in the top 4% of schools for progression to third level education; and been ranked 1st in North Dublin, and 7th in Ireland, by the Sunday Times in 2020. The school has laboratories and a library.

=== Sports ===
The school offers a range of sports, competing in camogie (since the 1940s), field hockey, basketball, badminton, ladies' Gaelic football, tennis (with Clontarf Tennis Club) and athletics (in cooperation with Raheny Shamrock Athletic Club). Some sports use the school's own hall and outdoor sports facilities, some also use external venues such as Baldoyle Badminton Centre, playing fields in St Anne's Park and with basketball at the Irish Wheelchair Association premises nearby.

=== Other extra-curricular activities ===
The school supports a range of other extra-curricular activities, and strongly encourages participation. Activities include school tours, a school choir, an annual musical, social justice programmes and fund-raising projects.

== Ethos and Governance ==
The school retains the ethos of the Holy Faith sisters, and this is elaborated into a mission statement. The school is under the direction of the Le Cheile Schools Trust, which pools the assets of fifteen religious teaching orders, and provides oversight, policy guidance, and final authority for more than 60 schools. It is managed by a board of management comprising 4 nominees of the Trust, 2 nominated by the teachers, and 2 nominated by parents, and has the school principal attending as non-voting secretary. The board serves for three year terms, and is the formal employer at the school, as well as the authority defining school policies. There is a Parents' Association, with representative and fundraising roles, and the student body has a head prefect and four prefects.

The school has an admission policy which allocates priority to girls from Belgrove (St Eoin's) National School in Clontarf, followed by sisters of present and past pupils, residents of the three Clontarf Roman Catholic parishes, daughters of present and past staff, daughters of past pupils, and then all other applicants. Tests are required but are not used in admissions decisions, and entry classes are mixed ability.

== Operation ==
=== Staffing and management ===
Holy Faith Clontarf has a principal teacher and deputy principal, and five assistant principals, and each year has an assigned leading teacher. The staff complement includes a guidance counsellor, a learning support teacher and a special needs assistant, as well as a secretarial staff, and there is also a part-time chaplain. The Department of Education supplies an allocation of full-time, and some part-time teachers, and the school additionally employs some supplementary part-time teachers.

=== Uniform and timetable ===
The school has a compulsory uniform, and offers paid supervised study periods.

=== Funding ===
The school's primary funding source is the Department of Education and Youth. It has two suggested voluntary parental contributions, an "amenities subscription" and a "games subscription", and a further optional development contribution; in 2016, these were 120, 90 and 275 euro respectively. It, and its parents' association, also run fund-raising activities.

=== Transport ===
The school is adjacent to a Dublin Bus route on the coastal road, and near a Dublin Area Rapid Transit station, Clontarf Road railway station. It also has its own bus service, with a morning route passing Portmarnock, the Malahide Road and Fairview, and an afternoon route taking in Raheny, Donaghmede, Baldoyle, Portmarnock and Malahide.

== Notable past pupils ==
- Mary Banotti, nurse and MEP (1984-2004)
- Pat Barker, former professor and registrar at Dublin City University, accountancy profession leader
- Fiona Coghlan, rugby union international, captain of the Ireland and Barbarians teams
- Catherine Dunne, writer
- Nadia Forde, model and TV personality
- Bernadette Greevy, singer and artistic director
- F. X. Martin, Irish cleric, historian and archivist
- Evelyn Owens, trade union leader
- Feargal Quinn, entrepreneur, founded of Superquinn, senator
- Emma Teeling, professor of zoology at UCD, genomicist
- Lyra Valkyria, WWE Wrestler
